This is a partial list of unnumbered minor planets for principal provisional designations assigned during 16–30 September 2001. , a total of 549 bodies remain unnumbered for this period. Objects for this year are listed on the following pages: A–E · Fi · Fii · G–O · P–R · S · T · U · V–W and X–Y. Also see previous and next year.

S 

|- id="2001 SY1" bgcolor=#E9E9E9
| 1 ||  || MBA-M || 17.4 || 1.4 km || multiple || 2001–2020 || 04 Jan 2020 || 167 || align=left | Disc.: Desert Eagle Obs. || 
|- id="2001 SQ3" bgcolor=#FFC2E0
| 2 ||  || APO || 21.6 || data-sort-value="0.17" | 170 m || multiple || 2001–2014 || 30 Jan 2014 || 114 || align=left | Disc.: LINEARPotentially hazardous object || 
|- id="2001 SZ4" bgcolor=#E9E9E9
| 0 ||  || MBA-M || 16.90 || 1.8 km || multiple || 2001–2021 || 11 May 2021 || 103 || align=left | Disc.: LINEARAlt.: 2018 SH2 || 
|- id="2001 SE5" bgcolor=#FA8072
| 5 ||  || MCA || 18.4 || 1.2 km || single || 68 days || 17 Oct 2001 || 40 || align=left | Disc.: LINEAR || 
|- id="2001 SR5" bgcolor=#fefefe
| 1 ||  || MBA-I || 17.9 || data-sort-value="0.78" | 780 m || multiple || 2001–2018 || 17 Dec 2018 || 89 || align=left | Disc.: LINEAR || 
|- id="2001 SR6" bgcolor=#E9E9E9
| 1 ||  || MBA-M || 17.7 || data-sort-value="0.86" | 860 m || multiple || 2001–2020 || 16 Mar 2020 || 43 || align=left | Disc.: SpacewatchAlt.: 2015 BZ46 || 
|- id="2001 SL7" bgcolor=#fefefe
| 0 ||  || MBA-I || 18.6 || data-sort-value="0.57" | 570 m || multiple || 2001–2019 || 02 Nov 2019 || 54 || align=left | Disc.: LPL/Spacewatch II || 
|- id="2001 SN8" bgcolor=#E9E9E9
| 1 ||  || MBA-M || 18.6 || data-sort-value="0.57" | 570 m || multiple || 2001–2018 || 10 Dec 2018 || 41 || align=left | Disc.: SpacewatchAlt.: 2015 AG276 || 
|- id="2001 SO8" bgcolor=#E9E9E9
| 0 ||  || MBA-M || 17.3 || 1.5 km || multiple || 2001–2021 || 10 Apr 2021 || 107 || align=left | Disc.: SpacewatchAlt.: 2014 SX312 || 
|- id="2001 SV8" bgcolor=#FA8072
| 0 ||  || MCA || 20.43 || data-sort-value="0.24" | 240 m || multiple || 2001–2021 || 09 Nov 2021 || 120 || align=left | Disc.: SpacewatchAlt.: 2011 SS68 || 
|- id="2001 SJ9" bgcolor=#FFC2E0
| 2 ||  || AMO || 19.6 || data-sort-value="0.43" | 430 m || multiple || 1998–2004 || 09 Nov 2004 || 85 || align=left | Disc.: LINEAR || 
|- id="2001 SC11" bgcolor=#E9E9E9
| 0 ||  || MBA-M || 17.0 || 2.2 km || multiple || 2001–2020 || 12 Dec 2020 || 175 || align=left | Disc.: LINEAR || 
|- id="2001 SP11" bgcolor=#E9E9E9
| 2 ||  || MBA-M || 17.73 || 860 m || multiple || 2001-2022 || 11 Oct 2022 || 94 || align=left | Disc.: LINEAR || 
|- id="2001 SN17" bgcolor=#E9E9E9
| 0 ||  || MBA-M || 17.3 || 1.9 km || multiple || 2001–2020 || 15 Jan 2020 || 177 || align=left | Disc.: LINEARAlt.: 2010 RU9 || 
|- id="2001 SB23" bgcolor=#fefefe
| 0 ||  || MBA-I || 18.64 || data-sort-value="0.56" | 560 m || multiple || 2001–2021 || 24 Nov 2021 || 124 || align=left | Disc.: LINEAR || 
|- id="2001 SV26" bgcolor=#FA8072
| 0 ||  || MCA || 18.84 || data-sort-value="0.51" | 510 m || multiple || 2001–2021 || 25 Sep 2021 || 123 || align=left | Disc.: LINEAR || 
|- id="2001 SM27" bgcolor=#E9E9E9
| 0 ||  || MBA-M || 17.0 || 2.2 km || multiple || 2001–2021 || 16 Jan 2021 || 224 || align=left | Disc.: LINEARAlt.: 2015 PG310 || 
|- id="2001 SG29" bgcolor=#d6d6d6
| 0 ||  || MBA-O || 17.18 || 2 km || multiple || 2001-2022 || 23 Dec 2022 || 65 || align=left | Disc.: LINEARAlt.: 2022 UC89 || 
|- id="2001 SO32" bgcolor=#E9E9E9
| 0 ||  || MBA-M || 17.9 || 1.1 km || multiple || 2001–2020 || 19 Apr 2020 || 107 || align=left | Disc.: LINEARAlt.: 2014 WM426 || 
|- id="2001 SV38" bgcolor=#E9E9E9
| 1 ||  || MBA-M || 16.9 || 2.6 km || multiple || 2001–2021 || 16 Jan 2021 || 182 || align=left | Disc.: LINEAR || 
|- id="2001 SM39" bgcolor=#E9E9E9
| 0 ||  || MBA-M || 17.33 || 1.4 km || multiple || 2001–2021 || 08 May 2021 || 136 || align=left | Disc.: LINEARAlt.: 2018 VU63 || 
|- id="2001 SK42" bgcolor=#E9E9E9
| 1 ||  || MBA-M || 17.6 || 1.3 km || multiple || 2001–2019 || 03 Jan 2019 || 142 || align=left | Disc.: LINEARAlt.: 2018 RX12 || 
|- id="2001 SL42" bgcolor=#E9E9E9
| 0 ||  || MBA-M || 17.09 || 1.6 km || multiple || 2001–2021 || 07 Jul 2021 || 300 || align=left | Disc.: LINEAR || 
|- id="2001 ST62" bgcolor=#fefefe
| 0 ||  || MBA-I || 17.8 || data-sort-value="0.82" | 820 m || multiple || 2001–2021 || 24 Jan 2021 || 140 || align=left | Disc.: LINEAR || 
|- id="2001 SU66" bgcolor=#E9E9E9
| 0 ||  || MBA-M || 17.5 || 1.3 km || multiple || 2001–2020 || 30 Jan 2020 || 110 || align=left | Disc.: LINEAR || 
|- id="2001 SX72" bgcolor=#E9E9E9
| 1 ||  || MBA-M || 17.1 || 2.1 km || multiple || 2001–2021 || 17 Jan 2021 || 65 || align=left | Disc.: LINEARAlt.: 2010 LL81 || 
|- id="2001 SE73" bgcolor=#FA8072
| 1 ||  || MCA || 18.5 || data-sort-value="0.59" | 590 m || multiple || 2001–2017 || 09 Dec 2017 || 102 || align=left | Disc.: LINEAR || 
|- id="2001 SH76" bgcolor=#E9E9E9
| 2 ||  || MBA-M || 17.9 || 1.1 km || multiple || 2001–2019 || 25 Jan 2019 || 124 || align=left | Disc.: LINEAR || 
|- id="2001 SX76" bgcolor=#FA8072
| 2 ||  || MCA || 19.1 || data-sort-value="0.45" | 450 m || multiple || 2001–2014 || 12 Nov 2014 || 69 || align=left | Disc.: LINEAR || 
|- id="2001 SL78" bgcolor=#d6d6d6
| 0 ||  || MBA-O || 17.94 || 1.3 km || multiple || 2001-2022 || 14 Dec 2022 || 197 || align=left | Disc.: LINEARAlt.: 2001 QA338 || 
|- id="2001 SS80" bgcolor=#d6d6d6
| 0 ||  || MBA-O || 16.7 || 2.5 km || multiple || 2001–2019 || 08 Jan 2019 || 49 || align=left | Disc.: LINEARAlt.: 2017 PU53 || 
|- id="2001 SO81" bgcolor=#E9E9E9
| 0 ||  || MBA-M || 17.1 || 1.6 km || multiple || 2000–2021 || 14 Jan 2021 || 102 || align=left | Disc.: LINEAR || 
|- id="2001 SR82" bgcolor=#FA8072
| 2 ||  || MCA || 19.4 || data-sort-value="0.39" | 390 m || multiple || 2001–2021 || 30 Nov 2021 || 58 || align=left | Disc.: LINEARAdded on 24 December 2021 || 
|- id="2001 SH83" bgcolor=#FA8072
| 2 ||  || MCA || 19.3 || data-sort-value="0.41" | 410 m || multiple || 2001–2020 || 16 Nov 2020 || 87 || align=left | Disc.: LINEAR || 
|- id="2001 SM83" bgcolor=#d6d6d6
| 0 ||  || MBA-O || 16.3 || 3.1 km || multiple || 2001–2018 || 15 Oct 2018 || 90 || align=left | Disc.: LINEAR || 
|- id="2001 SY84" bgcolor=#fefefe
| 0 ||  || MBA-I || 18.38 || data-sort-value="0.63" | 630 m || multiple || 2001–2021 || 29 Nov 2021 || 122 || align=left | Disc.: LINEARAlt.: 2014 OC383 || 
|- id="2001 SQ85" bgcolor=#E9E9E9
| 0 ||  || MBA-M || 16.7 || 1.4 km || multiple || 1960–2020 || 25 May 2020 || 92 || align=left | Disc.: LINEARAlt.: 6013 P-L || 
|- id="2001 SS86" bgcolor=#E9E9E9
| 3 ||  || MBA-M || 17.9 || 1.1 km || multiple || 2001–2014 || 23 Aug 2014 || 27 || align=left | Disc.: LINEARAlt.: 2014 QM162 || 
|- id="2001 SR87" bgcolor=#d6d6d6
| 0 ||  || MBA-O || 16.09 || 3.4 km || multiple || 2001–2021 || 18 Apr 2021 || 151 || align=left | Disc.: LINEARAlt.: 2012 TT106 || 
|- id="2001 SM88" bgcolor=#fefefe
| 0 ||  || MBA-I || 18.1 || data-sort-value="0.71" | 710 m || multiple || 2001–2019 || 08 Nov 2019 || 61 || align=left | Disc.: LINEAR || 
|- id="2001 SD89" bgcolor=#fefefe
| 1 ||  || MBA-I || 18.2 || data-sort-value="0.68" | 680 m || multiple || 2001–2020 || 02 Feb 2020 || 102 || align=left | Disc.: LINEARAlt.: 2008 UY386 || 
|- id="2001 SC90" bgcolor=#E9E9E9
| 2 ||  || MBA-M || 18.3 || data-sort-value="0.92" | 920 m || multiple || 2001–2018 || 12 Nov 2018 || 65 || align=left | Disc.: LINEAR || 
|- id="2001 SD91" bgcolor=#E9E9E9
| 0 ||  || MBA-M || 17.2 || 1.5 km || multiple || 2001–2018 || 08 Aug 2018 || 88 || align=left | Disc.: LINEARAlt.: 2010 UN78 || 
|- id="2001 SH91" bgcolor=#d6d6d6
| 0 ||  || MBA-O || 16.5 || 2.8 km || multiple || 2001–2019 || 19 Dec 2019 || 52 || align=left | Disc.: LINEARAdded on 22 July 2020 || 
|- id="2001 ST92" bgcolor=#d6d6d6
| 0 ||  || MBA-O || 15.5 || 3.6 km || multiple || 2001–2021 || 15 Jan 2021 || 249 || align=left | Disc.: LINEARAlt.: 2010 DN46, 2010 LK25 || 
|- id="2001 SB93" bgcolor=#E9E9E9
| 0 ||  || MBA-M || 17.7 || 1.2 km || multiple || 2001–2020 || 25 Jan 2020 || 119 || align=left | Disc.: LINEAR || 
|- id="2001 SS93" bgcolor=#E9E9E9
| 1 ||  || MBA-M || 17.4 || 1.8 km || multiple || 2001–2021 || 16 Jan 2021 || 93 || align=left | Disc.: LINEARAlt.: 2015 SB8 || 
|- id="2001 SW93" bgcolor=#d6d6d6
| 0 ||  || MBA-O || 16.45 || 2.9 km || multiple || 2001–2021 || 07 Apr 2021 || 106 || align=left | Disc.: LINEARAlt.: 2015 BM465 || 
|- id="2001 SJ94" bgcolor=#fefefe
| 2 ||  || MBA-I || 19.1 || data-sort-value="0.45" | 450 m || multiple || 2001–2019 || 31 Dec 2019 || 45 || align=left | Disc.: LINEAR || 
|- id="2001 SB95" bgcolor=#E9E9E9
| 1 ||  || MBA-M || 18.2 || data-sort-value="0.68" | 680 m || multiple || 1997–2015 || 22 Jan 2015 || 53 || align=left | Disc.: LINEARAlt.: 2011 BW148 || 
|- id="2001 SD95" bgcolor=#fefefe
| 0 ||  || MBA-I || 18.2 || data-sort-value="0.68" | 680 m || multiple || 2000–2021 || 15 Jun 2021 || 137 || align=left | Disc.: LINEARAlt.: 2008 UK265 || 
|- id="2001 SM95" bgcolor=#fefefe
| 0 ||  || MBA-I || 18.4 || data-sort-value="0.62" | 620 m || multiple || 2001–2018 || 12 Nov 2018 || 113 || align=left | Disc.: LINEAR || 
|- id="2001 SW96" bgcolor=#E9E9E9
| 0 ||  || MBA-M || 17.4 || 1.8 km || multiple || 2001–2021 || 08 Jan 2021 || 86 || align=left | Disc.: LINEARAlt.: 2015 UT16 || 
|- id="2001 SJ97" bgcolor=#d6d6d6
| 0 ||  || MBA-O || 16.22 || 3.2 km || multiple || 2001–2021 || 03 May 2021 || 127 || align=left | Disc.: LINEARAlt.: 2012 TN46 || 
|- id="2001 SS97" bgcolor=#fefefe
| 0 ||  || MBA-I || 18.4 || data-sort-value="0.62" | 620 m || multiple || 2001–2019 || 25 Nov 2019 || 75 || align=left | Disc.: LINEARAlt.: 2008 PC15 || 
|- id="2001 SK98" bgcolor=#E9E9E9
| 1 ||  || MBA-M || 17.4 || data-sort-value="0.98" | 980 m || multiple || 2001–2019 || 04 Jan 2019 || 40 || align=left | Disc.: LINEARAlt.: 2005 QM105 || 
|- id="2001 SX98" bgcolor=#E9E9E9
| 1 ||  || MBA-M || 18.4 || data-sort-value="0.88" | 880 m || multiple || 2001–2018 || 18 Oct 2018 || 54 || align=left | Disc.: LINEARAlt.: 2014 UN50 || 
|- id="2001 SE99" bgcolor=#d6d6d6
| 0 ||  || MBA-O || 16.5 || 2.8 km || multiple || 2001–2018 || 15 Oct 2018 || 84 || align=left | Disc.: LINEARAlt.: 2012 PR35 || 
|- id="2001 SG99" bgcolor=#E9E9E9
| 0 ||  || MBA-M || 17.1 || 1.1 km || multiple || 2001–2020 || 16 Mar 2020 || 83 || align=left | Disc.: LINEARAlt.: 2016 EH171 || 
|- id="2001 SO99" bgcolor=#fefefe
| 0 ||  || MBA-I || 17.9 || data-sort-value="0.78" | 780 m || multiple || 2001–2021 || 18 Jan 2021 || 99 || align=left | Disc.: LINEAR || 
|- id="2001 SG100" bgcolor=#E9E9E9
| 0 ||  || MBA-M || 17.38 || 1.4 km || multiple || 1997–2021 || 12 May 2021 || 151 || align=left | Disc.: LINEAR || 
|- id="2001 SX100" bgcolor=#E9E9E9
| 0 ||  || MBA-M || 17.40 || data-sort-value="0.98" | 980 m || multiple || 2001–2021 || 05 Aug 2021 || 92 || align=left | Disc.: LINEAR || 
|- id="2001 SU101" bgcolor=#fefefe
| 1 ||  || MBA-I || 18.6 || data-sort-value="0.57" | 570 m || multiple || 2001–2019 || 27 May 2019 || 51 || align=left | Disc.: LINEARAlt.: 2005 WU98 || 
|- id="2001 SC102" bgcolor=#fefefe
| 1 ||  || MBA-I || 18.6 || data-sort-value="0.57" | 570 m || multiple || 2001–2020 || 16 Feb 2020 || 132 || align=left | Disc.: LINEARAlt.: 2008 TH56 || 
|- id="2001 SG102" bgcolor=#E9E9E9
| 0 ||  || MBA-M || 17.6 || data-sort-value="0.90" | 900 m || multiple || 2001–2020 || 22 Apr 2020 || 33 || align=left | Disc.: LINEAR || 
|- id="2001 SX102" bgcolor=#fefefe
| 0 ||  || MBA-I || 17.3 || 1.0 km || multiple || 2001–2021 || 06 Jan 2021 || 143 || align=left | Disc.: LINEAR || 
|- id="2001 SG103" bgcolor=#fefefe
| 2 ||  || MBA-I || 18.9 || data-sort-value="0.49" | 490 m || multiple || 2001–2017 || 16 Oct 2017 || 64 || align=left | Disc.: LINEARAlt.: 2014 WR27 || 
|- id="2001 SP103" bgcolor=#d6d6d6
| – ||  || MBA-O || 15.4 || 4.6 km || single || 29 days || 19 Oct 2001 || 15 || align=left | Disc.: LINEAR || 
|- id="2001 SM104" bgcolor=#FA8072
| 0 ||  || MCA || 19.64 || data-sort-value="0.35" | 350 m || multiple || 2001–2020 || 14 Aug 2020 || 52 || align=left | Disc.: LINEAR || 
|- id="2001 SD112" bgcolor=#fefefe
| 0 ||  || MBA-I || 17.6 || data-sort-value="0.90" | 900 m || multiple || 2001–2020 || 16 May 2020 || 70 || align=left | Disc.: LINEARAlt.: 2008 TN8 || 
|- id="2001 SF112" bgcolor=#fefefe
| 0 ||  || HUN || 18.2 || data-sort-value="0.68" | 680 m || multiple || 2001–2021 || 06 Jan 2021 || 142 || align=left | Disc.: LINEAR || 
|- id="2001 SK112" bgcolor=#fefefe
| 1 ||  || HUN || 18.1 || data-sort-value="0.71" | 710 m || multiple || 2001–2020 || 19 Oct 2020 || 108 || align=left | Disc.: LINEAR || 
|- id="2001 SM112" bgcolor=#fefefe
| 0 ||  || HUN || 18.73 || data-sort-value="0.53" | 530 m || multiple || 2001–2021 || 13 Jul 2021 || 126 || align=left | Disc.: LINEARAlt.: 2013 EO23 || 
|- id="2001 SO115" bgcolor=#FA8072
| 0 ||  || MCA || 18.7 || data-sort-value="0.54" | 540 m || multiple || 2001–2017 || 26 Jul 2017 || 149 || align=left | Disc.: LONEOS || 
|- id="2001 SP115" bgcolor=#FA8072
| – ||  || MCA || 20.6 || data-sort-value="0.23" | 230 m || single || 34 days || 23 Oct 2001 || 36 || align=left | Disc.: LINEAR || 
|- id="2001 SR116" bgcolor=#fefefe
| 0 ||  || HUN || 18.4 || data-sort-value="0.62" | 620 m || multiple || 2001–2021 || 06 Jan 2021 || 221 || align=left | Disc.: LINEAR || 
|- id="2001 SZ125" bgcolor=#E9E9E9
| 0 ||  || MBA-M || 17.6 || 1.3 km || multiple || 2001–2018 || 08 Aug 2018 || 117 || align=left | Disc.: LINEARAlt.: 2010 VJ172, 2010 WJ22 || 
|- id="2001 SL126" bgcolor=#d6d6d6
| 1 ||  || MBA-O || 17.97 || 1.2 km || multiple || 2001-2022 || 30 Oct 2022 || 64 || align=left | Disc.: LINEAR || 
|- id="2001 ST126" bgcolor=#E9E9E9
| 2 ||  || MBA-M || 18.6 || data-sort-value="0.80" | 800 m || multiple || 2001–2018 || 15 Oct 2018 || 52 || align=left | Disc.: LINEARAlt.: 2014 WA91 || 
|- id="2001 SA128" bgcolor=#fefefe
| 1 ||  || MBA-I || 17.9 || data-sort-value="0.78" | 780 m || multiple || 2001–2019 || 14 Nov 2019 || 192 || align=left | Disc.: LINEAR || 
|- id="2001 SN129" bgcolor=#FA8072
| 0 ||  || MCA || 18.75 || data-sort-value="0.54" | 540 m || multiple || 2001-2022 || 29 Oct 2022 || 997 || align=left | Disc.: LINEARAlt.: 2022 QQ61 || 
|- id="2001 SR129" bgcolor=#E9E9E9
| 1 ||  || MBA-M || 17.7 || 1.2 km || multiple || 2001–2018 || 10 Jul 2018 || 56 || align=left | Disc.: LINEAR || 
|- id="2001 SG132" bgcolor=#d6d6d6
| 0 ||  || MBA-O || 16.62 || 2.6 km || multiple || 2001–2021 || 15 Apr 2021 || 116 || align=left | Disc.: LINEAR || 
|- id="2001 SK133" bgcolor=#E9E9E9
| 2 ||  || MBA-M || 17.1 || 1.1 km || multiple || 2001–2016 || 06 Mar 2016 || 62 || align=left | Disc.: LINEAR || 
|- id="2001 SU134" bgcolor=#E9E9E9
| 1 ||  || MBA-M || 17.6 || 1.3 km || multiple || 2001–2020 || 29 Jan 2020 || 69 || align=left | Disc.: LINEARAlt.: 2014 SA66 || 
|- id="2001 SY138" bgcolor=#d6d6d6
| 1 ||  || MBA-O || 16.8 || 2.4 km || multiple || 2001–2019 || 31 Dec 2019 || 58 || align=left | Disc.: LINEAR || 
|- id="2001 ST139" bgcolor=#fefefe
| 1 ||  || MBA-I || 18.0 || data-sort-value="0.75" | 750 m || multiple || 2001–2020 || 21 Jan 2020 || 167 || align=left | Disc.: LINEAR || 
|- id="2001 SE144" bgcolor=#fefefe
| 3 ||  || MBA-I || 18.4 || data-sort-value="0.62" | 620 m || multiple || 2001–2015 || 21 Nov 2015 || 68 || align=left | Disc.: LINEARAlt.: 2008 TE131 || 
|- id="2001 SM144" bgcolor=#fefefe
| 0 ||  || MBA-I || 17.5 || data-sort-value="0.94" | 940 m || multiple || 2001–2021 || 18 Jan 2021 || 126 || align=left | Disc.: LINEAR || 
|- id="2001 SU144" bgcolor=#E9E9E9
| 0 ||  || MBA-M || 17.6 || 1.3 km || multiple || 2001–2019 || 26 Nov 2019 || 80 || align=left | Disc.: LINEARAlt.: 2014 QJ376 || 
|- id="2001 SE145" bgcolor=#d6d6d6
| 0 ||  || MBA-O || 15.9 || 3.7 km || multiple || 2001–2021 || 16 Jan 2021 || 131 || align=left | Disc.: LINEARAlt.: 2016 GE7 || 
|- id="2001 SD146" bgcolor=#fefefe
| 0 ||  || MBA-I || 17.70 || 1.8 km || multiple || 2001–2022 || 27 Jan 2022 || 85 || align=left | Disc.: LINEARAlt.: 2010 CN15 || 
|- id="2001 SQ152" bgcolor=#fefefe
| 0 ||  || MBA-I || 17.8 || data-sort-value="0.82" | 820 m || multiple || 2001–2021 || 17 Jan 2021 || 87 || align=left | Disc.: LINEARAlt.: 2012 TY9 || 
|- id="2001 SJ154" bgcolor=#E9E9E9
| 0 ||  || MBA-M || 17.1 || 1.6 km || multiple || 2001–2019 || 29 Nov 2019 || 147 || align=left | Disc.: LINEAR || 
|- id="2001 SM157" bgcolor=#E9E9E9
| 1 ||  || MBA-M || 17.3 || 1.9 km || multiple || 2001–2021 || 06 Jan 2021 || 108 || align=left | Disc.: LINEAR || 
|- id="2001 SC160" bgcolor=#E9E9E9
| 0 ||  || MBA-M || 17.2 || 1.5 km || multiple || 2001–2018 || 29 Sep 2018 || 180 || align=left | Disc.: LINEAR || 
|- id="2001 SJ165" bgcolor=#fefefe
| 0 ||  || MBA-I || 18.28 || data-sort-value="0.66" | 660 m || multiple || 2001–2021 || 14 Apr 2021 || 160 || align=left | Disc.: LINEARAlt.: 2008 SQ10 || 
|- id="2001 SR165" bgcolor=#E9E9E9
| 0 ||  || MBA-M || 18.26 || data-sort-value="0.66" | 660 m || multiple || 2001–2021 || 18 Apr 2021 || 45 || align=left | Disc.: LINEARAlt.: 2005 NS68 || 
|- id="2001 SK166" bgcolor=#d6d6d6
| 0 ||  || MBA-O || 16.6 || 2.7 km || multiple || 2001–2017 || 21 Oct 2017 || 55 || align=left | Disc.: LINEAR || 
|- id="2001 SH167" bgcolor=#E9E9E9
| – ||  || MBA-M || 17.0 || 1.7 km || single || 35 days || 17 Oct 2001 || 36 || align=left | Disc.: LINEAR || 
|- id="2001 SV168" bgcolor=#FA8072
| 1 ||  || MCA || 17.9 || data-sort-value="0.78" | 780 m || multiple || 2001–2020 || 24 Jan 2020 || 240 || align=left | Disc.: LINEAR || 
|- id="2001 SU169" bgcolor=#FA8072
| 1 ||  || HUN || 18.1 || data-sort-value="0.71" | 710 m || multiple || 2001–2017 || 19 May 2017 || 68 || align=left | Disc.: NEAT || 
|- id="2001 SY169" bgcolor=#FFC2E0
| 4 ||  || APO || 23.1 || data-sort-value="0.085" | 85 m || multiple || 2001–2013 || 09 Mar 2013 || 492 || align=left | Disc.: LINEARAlt.: 2013 ET || 
|- id="2001 SZ169" bgcolor=#FFC2E0
| 7 ||  || AMO || 25.1 || data-sort-value="0.034" | 34 m || single || 5 days || 24 Sep 2001 || 21 || align=left | Disc.: LINEAR || 
|- id="2001 SA170" bgcolor=#FFC2E0
| 3 ||  || AMO || 22.8 || data-sort-value="0.098" | 98 m || single || 34 days || 24 Oct 2001 || 86 || align=left | Disc.: LINEAR || 
|- id="2001 SB170" bgcolor=#FFC2E0
| 7 ||  || APO || 22.6 || data-sort-value="0.11" | 110 m || single || 23 days || 13 Oct 2001 || 26 || align=left | Disc.: LINEAR || 
|- id="2001 SC170" bgcolor=#FFC2E0
| 0 ||  || AMO || 20.4 || data-sort-value="0.30" | 300 m || multiple || 2001–2018 || 12 Oct 2018 || 354 || align=left | Disc.: LINEARAlt.: 2018 HP1 || 
|- id="2001 SM170" bgcolor=#E9E9E9
| 0 ||  || MBA-M || 17.2 || 2.0 km || multiple || 2001–2019 || 22 Oct 2019 || 95 || align=left | Disc.: LINEARAlt.: 2006 WS40 || 
|- id="2001 SR170" bgcolor=#E9E9E9
| 3 ||  || MBA-M || 18.6 || data-sort-value="0.80" | 800 m || multiple || 2001–2018 || 05 Nov 2018 || 35 || align=left | Disc.: LINEAR || 
|- id="2001 SC171" bgcolor=#E9E9E9
| 3 ||  || MBA-M || 18.2 || data-sort-value="0.96" | 960 m || multiple || 2001–2018 || 29 Oct 2018 || 28 || align=left | Disc.: LINEAR || 
|- id="2001 SG171" bgcolor=#E9E9E9
| 0 ||  || MBA-M || 17.0 || 2.2 km || multiple || 2001–2021 || 12 Jan 2021 || 150 || align=left | Disc.: LINEARAlt.: 2015 UO61 || 
|- id="2001 SM172" bgcolor=#E9E9E9
| – ||  || MBA-M || 19.0 || data-sort-value="0.47" | 470 m || single || 51 days || 17 Oct 2001 || 16 || align=left | Disc.: LINEAR || 
|- id="2001 SS172" bgcolor=#E9E9E9
| 1 ||  || MBA-M || 17.8 || 1.2 km || multiple || 2001–2020 || 27 Jan 2020 || 104 || align=left | Disc.: LINEARAlt.: 2014 QD348 || 
|- id="2001 SX180" bgcolor=#E9E9E9
| 0 ||  || MBA-M || 17.48 || data-sort-value="0.95" | 950 m || multiple || 2001–2021 || 13 May 2021 || 116 || align=left | Disc.: LINEAR || 
|- id="2001 SD182" bgcolor=#E9E9E9
| 0 ||  || MBA-M || 17.63 || 1.3 km || multiple || 2001–2021 || 09 Apr 2021 || 116 || align=left | Disc.: LINEARAlt.: 2014 QZ384 || 
|- id="2001 SN183" bgcolor=#E9E9E9
| 3 ||  || MBA-M || 18.2 || data-sort-value="0.68" | 680 m || multiple || 2001–2019 || 09 Jan 2019 || 24 || align=left | Disc.: LINEARAlt.: 2018 XD17 || 
|- id="2001 SS183" bgcolor=#fefefe
| 0 ||  || MBA-I || 18.89 || data-sort-value="0.50" | 500 m || multiple || 2001–2021 || 02 Oct 2021 || 68 || align=left | Disc.: LINEAR || 
|- id="2001 SV183" bgcolor=#E9E9E9
| 0 ||  || MBA-M || 17.5 || data-sort-value="0.94" | 940 m || multiple || 2001–2021 || 08 Jun 2021 || 41 || align=left | Disc.: LINEAR || 
|- id="2001 SC184" bgcolor=#fefefe
| 0 ||  || MBA-I || 17.5 || data-sort-value="0.94" | 940 m || multiple || 2001–2019 || 08 Jun 2019 || 107 || align=left | Disc.: LINEARAlt.: 2012 RF29 || 
|- id="2001 SK184" bgcolor=#fefefe
| 0 ||  || MBA-I || 18.89 || data-sort-value="0.50" | 500 m || multiple || 2001–2019 || 03 Oct 2019 || 369 || align=left | Disc.: LINEAR || 
|- id="2001 SV184" bgcolor=#fefefe
| 0 ||  || MBA-I || 18.52 || data-sort-value="0.59" | 590 m || multiple || 2001–2021 || 24 Nov 2021 || 151 || align=left | Disc.: LINEARAlt.: 2011 RZ30 || 
|- id="2001 SH185" bgcolor=#E9E9E9
| 0 ||  || MBA-M || 16.6 || 2.7 km || multiple || 2001–2021 || 16 Jan 2021 || 129 || align=left | Disc.: LINEARAlt.: 2008 AG86 || 
|- id="2001 SW185" bgcolor=#fefefe
| 0 ||  || MBA-I || 18.4 || data-sort-value="0.62" | 620 m || multiple || 2001–2020 || 07 Dec 2020 || 96 || align=left | Disc.: LINEARAlt.: 2004 PB82 || 
|- id="2001 SK186" bgcolor=#E9E9E9
| 0 ||  || MBA-M || 17.0 || 2.2 km || multiple || 2001–2020 || 18 Dec 2020 || 60 || align=left | Disc.: LINEARAdded on 21 August 2021 || 
|- id="2001 SD187" bgcolor=#E9E9E9
| 2 ||  || MBA-M || 17.6 || data-sort-value="0.90" | 900 m || multiple || 2001–2019 || 08 Jan 2019 || 45 || align=left | Disc.: LINEARAlt.: 2015 BN121 || 
|- id="2001 SL187" bgcolor=#fefefe
| 0 ||  || MBA-I || 18.1 || data-sort-value="0.71" | 710 m || multiple || 2001–2019 || 25 Oct 2019 || 76 || align=left | Disc.: LINEAR || 
|- id="2001 SP188" bgcolor=#E9E9E9
| 3 ||  || MBA-M || 18.4 || data-sort-value="0.88" | 880 m || multiple || 2001–2014 || 30 Sep 2014 || 22 || align=left | Disc.: LINEAR || 
|- id="2001 SE189" bgcolor=#E9E9E9
| 3 ||  || MBA-M || 17.7 || data-sort-value="0.86" | 860 m || multiple || 2001–2018 || 29 Nov 2018 || 29 || align=left | Disc.: LINEAR || 
|- id="2001 SL190" bgcolor=#fefefe
| 1 ||  || MBA-I || 18.8 || data-sort-value="0.52" | 520 m || multiple || 1994–2019 || 20 Dec 2019 || 36 || align=left | Disc.: LINEARAlt.: 2015 PZ105 || 
|- id="2001 SC191" bgcolor=#fefefe
| 0 ||  || MBA-I || 17.5 || data-sort-value="0.94" | 940 m || multiple || 1993–2021 || 05 Jan 2021 || 129 || align=left | Disc.: LINEARAlt.: 2011 GB45, 2012 RW26 || 
|- id="2001 SA193" bgcolor=#fefefe
| 1 ||  || MBA-I || 18.4 || data-sort-value="0.62" | 620 m || multiple || 2001–2020 || 17 Dec 2020 || 55 || align=left | Disc.: LINEARAlt.: 2005 VO6, 2010 AR63 || 
|- id="2001 SF193" bgcolor=#d6d6d6
| 0 ||  || MBA-O || 16.1 || 3.4 km || multiple || 1995–2021 || 12 Jan 2021 || 132 || align=left | Disc.: LINEARAlt.: 2011 JZ4, 2015 BP224 || 
|- id="2001 SU193" bgcolor=#FA8072
| 1 ||  || MCA || 20.0 || data-sort-value="0.30" | 300 m || multiple || 2001–2014 || 18 Sep 2014 || 47 || align=left | Disc.: LINEAR || 
|- id="2001 SX193" bgcolor=#fefefe
| 2 ||  || MBA-I || 18.3 || data-sort-value="0.65" | 650 m || multiple || 2001–2020 || 09 Oct 2020 || 76 || align=left | Disc.: LINEARAlt.: 2005 UU326 || 
|- id="2001 SF194" bgcolor=#fefefe
| 1 ||  || MBA-I || 18.2 || data-sort-value="0.68" | 680 m || multiple || 2001–2021 || 04 Jan 2021 || 118 || align=left | Disc.: LINEAR || 
|- id="2001 SG195" bgcolor=#fefefe
| 4 ||  || MBA-I || 18.8 || data-sort-value="0.52" | 520 m || multiple || 2001–2016 || 05 Dec 2016 || 22 || align=left | Disc.: LINEAR || 
|- id="2001 SO195" bgcolor=#E9E9E9
| 1 ||  || MBA-M || 17.9 || 1.5 km || multiple || 2001–2020 || 15 Dec 2020 || 40 || align=left | Disc.: LINEAR || 
|- id="2001 SZ195" bgcolor=#E9E9E9
| 1 ||  || MBA-M || 18.2 || data-sort-value="0.96" | 960 m || multiple || 2001–2020 || 03 Jan 2020 || 50 || align=left | Disc.: LINEARAlt.: 2014 QB134 || 
|- id="2001 SU196" bgcolor=#fefefe
| 0 ||  || MBA-I || 18.82 || data-sort-value="0.51" | 510 m || multiple || 2001–2021 || 24 Nov 2021 || 77 || align=left | Disc.: LINEARAlt.: 2021 PF39 || 
|- id="2001 SJ197" bgcolor=#d6d6d6
| 1 ||  || MBA-O || 18.73 || 530 m || multiple || 2001-2022 || 02 Dec 2022 || 47 || align=left | Disc.: LINEARAlt.: 2022 SU85 || 
|- id="2001 ST198" bgcolor=#fefefe
| 0 ||  || MBA-I || 18.90 || data-sort-value="0.49" | 490 m || multiple || 2001–2021 || 05 Jul 2021 || 52 || align=left | Disc.: LINEAR || 
|- id="2001 SC199" bgcolor=#d6d6d6
| 0 ||  || MBA-O || 16.6 || 2.7 km || multiple || 1999–2019 || 24 Dec 2019 || 74 || align=left | Disc.: SpacewatchAlt.: 2001 QB333 || 
|- id="2001 SE199" bgcolor=#E9E9E9
| 3 ||  || MBA-M || 18.2 || data-sort-value="0.68" | 680 m || multiple || 2001–2019 || 04 Feb 2019 || 38 || align=left | Disc.: LINEAR || 
|- id="2001 SX199" bgcolor=#fefefe
| 0 ||  || MBA-I || 17.3 || 1.0 km || multiple || 2000–2020 || 20 Oct 2020 || 179 || align=left | Disc.: LINEAR || 
|- id="2001 SE200" bgcolor=#fefefe
| 0 ||  || MBA-I || 18.0 || data-sort-value="0.75" | 750 m || multiple || 2001–2020 || 10 Dec 2020 || 78 || align=left | Disc.: LINEARAlt.: 2015 HA84 || 
|- id="2001 SC201" bgcolor=#E9E9E9
| 0 ||  || MBA-M || 17.89 || 1.5 km || multiple || 2001–2019 || 26 Jul 2019 || 72 || align=left | Disc.: LINEARAlt.: 2010 JN42 || 
|- id="2001 SD201" bgcolor=#fefefe
| 0 ||  || MBA-I || 18.4 || data-sort-value="0.62" | 620 m || multiple || 1994–2019 || 20 Oct 2019 || 68 || align=left | Disc.: LINEAR || 
|- id="2001 SP201" bgcolor=#E9E9E9
| 0 ||  || MBA-M || 17.6 || 1.3 km || multiple || 2001–2020 || 22 Mar 2020 || 124 || align=left | Disc.: LINEAR || 
|- id="2001 SC202" bgcolor=#d6d6d6
| 2 ||  || MBA-O || 17.58 || 1.7 km || multiple || 2001-2017 || 29 Sep 2017 || 45 || align=left | Disc.: LINEARAlt.: 2017 QD60 || 
|- id="2001 SW202" bgcolor=#E9E9E9
| 1 ||  || MBA-M || 17.7 || 1.6 km || multiple || 2001–2020 || 08 Dec 2020 || 68 || align=left | Disc.: LINEARAlt.: 2006 UY386 || 
|- id="2001 SO203" bgcolor=#E9E9E9
| 0 ||  || MBA-M || 17.0 || 1.2 km || multiple || 2001–2020 || 17 May 2020 || 114 || align=left | Disc.: LINEAR || 
|- id="2001 SQ204" bgcolor=#d6d6d6
| 4 ||  || MBA-O || 18.2 || 1.3 km || multiple || 2001–2017 || 26 Nov 2017 || 21 || align=left | Disc.: LINEARAdded on 19 October 2020 || 
|- id="2001 SE205" bgcolor=#d6d6d6
| 1 ||  || MBA-O || 16.7 || 2.5 km || multiple || 2001–2018 || 14 Nov 2018 || 46 || align=left | Disc.: LINEAR || 
|- id="2001 ST206" bgcolor=#E9E9E9
| 0 ||  || MBA-M || 16.7 || 2.5 km || multiple || 2001–2021 || 17 Jan 2021 || 176 || align=left | Disc.: LINEAR || 
|- id="2001 SC207" bgcolor=#fefefe
| 0 ||  || MBA-I || 18.8 || data-sort-value="0.52" | 520 m || multiple || 2001–2020 || 24 Jan 2020 || 70 || align=left | Disc.: LINEARAlt.: 2019 UG17 || 
|- id="2001 SH208" bgcolor=#d6d6d6
| 0 ||  || MBA-O || 17.33 || 1.9 km || multiple || 2001–2021 || 14 May 2021 || 100 || align=left | Disc.: LINEAR || 
|- id="2001 SR208" bgcolor=#E9E9E9
| 0 ||  || MBA-M || 17.8 || data-sort-value="0.82" | 820 m || multiple || 2001–2019 || 27 Jan 2019 || 55 || align=left | Disc.: LINEARAlt.: 2007 EZ162 || 
|- id="2001 SU208" bgcolor=#E9E9E9
| 2 ||  || MBA-M || 18.0 || 1.4 km || multiple || 2001–2019 || 26 Nov 2019 || 52 || align=left | Disc.: LINEAR || 
|- id="2001 SJ209" bgcolor=#E9E9E9
| 2 ||  || MBA-M || 17.7 || 1.6 km || multiple || 1992–2019 || 29 Oct 2019 || 65 || align=left | Disc.: LINEARAlt.: 2010 RF82, 2015 XL343 || 
|- id="2001 SU209" bgcolor=#E9E9E9
| 0 ||  || MBA-M || 17.3 || 1.9 km || multiple || 2001–2021 || 18 Jan 2021 || 73 || align=left | Disc.: LINEAR || 
|- id="2001 SV209" bgcolor=#E9E9E9
| 0 ||  || MBA-M || 17.1 || 2.1 km || multiple || 2001–2021 || 05 Jan 2021 || 85 || align=left | Disc.: LINEARAlt.: 2015 UF48 || 
|- id="2001 SN210" bgcolor=#d6d6d6
| 0 ||  || MBA-O || 16.64 || 2.6 km || multiple || 2001–2021 || 07 Jul 2021 || 141 || align=left | Disc.: LINEAR || 
|- id="2001 SQ210" bgcolor=#fefefe
| 0 ||  || MBA-I || 17.82 || data-sort-value="0.81" | 810 m || multiple || 2001–2022 || 26 Jan 2022 || 171 || align=left | Disc.: LINEARAlt.: 2011 FY14, 2012 OJ2, 2016 RS30 || 
|- id="2001 SD211" bgcolor=#E9E9E9
| 0 ||  || MBA-M || 17.75 || 1.2 km || multiple || 2001–2021 || 08 May 2021 || 129 || align=left | Disc.: LINEARAlt.: 2014 TS20 || 
|- id="2001 SQ211" bgcolor=#E9E9E9
| – ||  || MBA-M || 18.1 || data-sort-value="0.71" | 710 m || single || 22 days || 11 Oct 2001 || 18 || align=left | Disc.: LINEAR || 
|- id="2001 SX211" bgcolor=#E9E9E9
| 0 ||  || MBA-M || 17.74 || 1.2 km || multiple || 2001–2021 || 07 Jun 2021 || 116 || align=left | Disc.: LINEARAlt.: 2014 WH476 || 
|- id="2001 SQ215" bgcolor=#FA8072
| 2 ||  || MCA || 19.0 || data-sort-value="0.47" | 470 m || multiple || 2001–2018 || 15 Sep 2018 || 46 || align=left | Disc.: LINEAR || 
|- id="2001 SC216" bgcolor=#fefefe
| 1 ||  || MBA-I || 18.2 || data-sort-value="0.68" | 680 m || multiple || 2001–2019 || 30 Nov 2019 || 132 || align=left | Disc.: LINEARAlt.: 2012 VL72 || 
|- id="2001 SD216" bgcolor=#E9E9E9
| 1 ||  || MBA-M || 18.3 || data-sort-value="0.92" | 920 m || multiple || 2001–2018 || 10 Nov 2018 || 59 || align=left | Disc.: LINEARAlt.: 2014 WA36 || 
|- id="2001 SE216" bgcolor=#E9E9E9
| 0 ||  || MBA-M || 17.7 || 1.2 km || multiple || 2001–2019 || 29 Nov 2019 || 82 || align=left | Disc.: LINEARAlt.: 2010 TH184, 2014 OW87 || 
|- id="2001 SV216" bgcolor=#fefefe
| 2 ||  || MBA-I || 18.3 || data-sort-value="0.65" | 650 m || multiple || 2001–2019 || 06 Jul 2019 || 67 || align=left | Disc.: LINEAR || 
|- id="2001 SY216" bgcolor=#fefefe
| 1 ||  || MBA-I || 18.2 || data-sort-value="0.68" | 680 m || multiple || 2001–2021 || 18 Jan 2021 || 83 || align=left | Disc.: LINEARAlt.: 2005 UM273 || 
|- id="2001 SD217" bgcolor=#fefefe
| 0 ||  || MBA-I || 18.3 || data-sort-value="0.65" | 650 m || multiple || 2001–2020 || 17 Dec 2020 || 93 || align=left | Disc.: LINEAR || 
|- id="2001 SN218" bgcolor=#fefefe
| 1 ||  || MBA-I || 18.38 || data-sort-value="0.63" | 630 m || multiple || 2001–2022 || 08 Jan 2022 || 69 || align=left | Disc.: LINEARAlt.: 2005 UO499 || 
|- id="2001 SA219" bgcolor=#d6d6d6
| 1 ||  || MBA-O || 17.0 || 2.2 km || multiple || 2001–2019 || 03 Apr 2019 || 62 || align=left | Disc.: LINEAR || 
|- id="2001 SK219" bgcolor=#E9E9E9
| 0 ||  || MBA-M || 17.3 || 1.5 km || multiple || 2001–2020 || 31 Jan 2020 || 97 || align=left | Disc.: LINEARAlt.: 2005 OL15 || 
|- id="2001 SF220" bgcolor=#E9E9E9
| 0 ||  || MBA-M || 17.4 || 1.4 km || multiple || 2001–2020 || 25 Jan 2020 || 82 || align=left | Disc.: LINEAR || 
|- id="2001 SC221" bgcolor=#d6d6d6
| 1 ||  || MBA-O || 17.52 || 1.7 km || multiple || 2001-2022 || 15 Dec 2022 || 54 || align=left | Disc.: LINEARAlt.: 2022 RM75 || 
|- id="2001 SK221" bgcolor=#fefefe
| 0 ||  || MBA-I || 18.64 || data-sort-value="0.56" | 560 m || multiple || 2001–2021 || 14 Sep 2021 || 109 || align=left | Disc.: LINEAR || 
|- id="2001 SN221" bgcolor=#fefefe
| 0 ||  || MBA-I || 18.32 || data-sort-value="0.64" | 640 m || multiple || 2001–2020 || 14 Feb 2020 || 156 || align=left | Disc.: LINEAR || 
|- id="2001 SW221" bgcolor=#fefefe
| 0 ||  || MBA-I || 18.0 || data-sort-value="0.75" | 750 m || multiple || 2001–2020 || 23 Oct 2020 || 69 || align=left | Disc.: LINEAR || 
|- id="2001 ST223" bgcolor=#E9E9E9
| 1 ||  || MBA-M || 18.08 || data-sort-value="0.72" | 720 m || multiple || 2001–2021 || 05 Jul 2021 || 52 || align=left | Disc.: LINEAR || 
|- id="2001 SH224" bgcolor=#E9E9E9
| 1 ||  || MBA-M || 17.6 || 1.7 km || multiple || 2001–2020 || 20 Dec 2020 || 76 || align=left | Disc.: LINEARAlt.: 2015 UA71 || 
|- id="2001 SJ224" bgcolor=#E9E9E9
| 0 ||  || MBA-M || 17.2 || 1.5 km || multiple || 2001–2020 || 19 Jan 2020 || 88 || align=left | Disc.: LINEAR || 
|- id="2001 SJ225" bgcolor=#d6d6d6
| 0 ||  || MBA-O || 16.82 || 2.4 km || multiple || 2001–2021 || 09 May 2021 || 61 || align=left | Disc.: LINEARAlt.: 2018 VU86 || 
|- id="2001 SX225" bgcolor=#fefefe
| 0 ||  || MBA-I || 18.39 || data-sort-value="0.62" | 620 m || multiple || 2001–2021 || 08 May 2021 || 116 || align=left | Disc.: LINEARAlt.: 2008 SC22 || 
|- id="2001 SB226" bgcolor=#fefefe
| 0 ||  || MBA-I || 17.9 || data-sort-value="0.78" | 780 m || multiple || 2001–2020 || 11 Dec 2020 || 147 || align=left | Disc.: LINEAR || 
|- id="2001 SK228" bgcolor=#fefefe
| 0 ||  || MBA-I || 18.0 || data-sort-value="0.75" | 750 m || multiple || 2001–2021 || 18 Jan 2021 || 109 || align=left | Disc.: LINEARAlt.: 2012 UY148 || 
|- id="2001 SA229" bgcolor=#E9E9E9
| 0 ||  || MBA-M || 16.6 || 2.7 km || multiple || 2001–2021 || 03 Jan 2021 || 96 || align=left | Disc.: LINEARAlt.: 2015 VG138 || 
|- id="2001 SP229" bgcolor=#E9E9E9
| 0 ||  || MBA-M || 17.3 || 1.5 km || multiple || 2001–2020 || 15 Feb 2020 || 122 || align=left | Disc.: LINEAR || 
|- id="2001 SR230" bgcolor=#fefefe
| 0 ||  || MBA-I || 17.8 || data-sort-value="0.82" | 820 m || multiple || 2001–2020 || 17 Dec 2020 || 168 || align=left | Disc.: LINEARAlt.: 2016 SS24 || 
|- id="2001 SY230" bgcolor=#fefefe
| 2 ||  || MBA-I || 18.1 || data-sort-value="0.71" | 710 m || multiple || 2001–2019 || 29 Oct 2019 || 89 || align=left | Disc.: LINEAR || 
|- id="2001 SP234" bgcolor=#fefefe
| 1 ||  || MBA-I || 17.7 || data-sort-value="0.86" | 860 m || multiple || 2001–2021 || 18 Jan 2021 || 89 || align=left | Disc.: LINEAR || 
|- id="2001 SE236" bgcolor=#E9E9E9
| 0 ||  || MBA-M || 17.33 || 1.4 km || multiple || 2001–2021 || 15 Apr 2021 || 109 || align=left | Disc.: LINEARAlt.: 2010 UR36 || 
|- id="2001 ST236" bgcolor=#fefefe
| 0 ||  || MBA-I || 17.8 || data-sort-value="0.82" | 820 m || multiple || 2001–2020 || 16 Dec 2020 || 145 || align=left | Disc.: LINEARAlt.: 2004 JZ50, 2011 FD70, 2012 RU32 || 
|- id="2001 SU236" bgcolor=#E9E9E9
| 0 ||  || MBA-M || 17.58 || 1.3 km || multiple || 2001–2021 || 15 Apr 2021 || 85 || align=left | Disc.: LINEARAlt.: 2014 QT327 || 
|- id="2001 SB239" bgcolor=#E9E9E9
| 1 ||  || MBA-M || 17.1 || 1.1 km || multiple || 2001–2020 || 21 Apr 2020 || 44 || align=left | Disc.: LINEAR || 
|- id="2001 SN248" bgcolor=#E9E9E9
| 0 ||  || MBA-M || 17.51 || data-sort-value="0.94" | 940 m || multiple || 2001–2018 || 17 Dec 2018 || 65 || align=left | Disc.: LINEARAlt.: 2016 CD333 || 
|- id="2001 ST248" bgcolor=#fefefe
| 0 ||  || MBA-I || 18.2 || data-sort-value="0.68" | 680 m || multiple || 2001–2020 || 10 Nov 2020 || 229 || align=left | Disc.: LINEAR || 
|- id="2001 SD251" bgcolor=#E9E9E9
| 1 ||  || MBA-M || 17.5 || 1.8 km || multiple || 2001–2021 || 05 Jan 2021 || 153 || align=left | Disc.: LINEAR || 
|- id="2001 SA252" bgcolor=#E9E9E9
| 1 ||  || MBA-M || 17.7 || 1.2 km || multiple || 2001–2018 || 04 Nov 2018 || 74 || align=left | Disc.: LINEARAlt.: 2014 UW168 || 
|- id="2001 SZ254" bgcolor=#E9E9E9
| 1 ||  || MBA-M || 17.1 || 2.1 km || multiple || 1992–2020 || 19 Jan 2020 || 122 || align=left | Disc.: LINEARAlt.: 2010 UQ47 || 
|- id="2001 SK256" bgcolor=#E9E9E9
| 0 ||  || MBA-M || 17.9 || 1.1 km || multiple || 2001–2020 || 21 Jan 2020 || 114 || align=left | Disc.: LINEARAlt.: 2014 SC287 || 
|- id="2001 SH258" bgcolor=#E9E9E9
| 0 ||  || MBA-M || 17.2 || 1.5 km || multiple || 2001–2020 || 24 Dec 2020 || 64 || align=left | Disc.: LINEARAlt.: 2014 QP476 || 
|- id="2001 SC259" bgcolor=#d6d6d6
| 0 ||  || MBA-O || 16.63 || 2.6 km || multiple || 2001–2021 || 15 Apr 2021 || 90 || align=left | Disc.: LINEARAlt.: 2015 FL50 || 
|- id="2001 SJ259" bgcolor=#fefefe
| 0 ||  || HUN || 18.3 || data-sort-value="0.65" | 650 m || multiple || 2001–2020 || 12 Nov 2020 || 99 || align=left | Disc.: LINEAR || 
|- id="2001 SW259" bgcolor=#d6d6d6
| 0 ||  || MBA-O || 16.65 || 2.6 km || multiple || 1996–2021 || 10 Sep 2021 || 151 || align=left | Disc.: LINEAR || 
|- id="2001 SY261" bgcolor=#E9E9E9
| 1 ||  || MBA-M || 18.61 || data-sort-value="0.80" | 800 m || multiple || 2001–2018 || 07 Nov 2018 || 37 || align=left | Disc.: LINEAR || 
|- id="2001 SJ262" bgcolor=#FFC2E0
| 0 ||  || AMO || 19.9 || data-sort-value="0.37" | 370 m || multiple || 2001–2006 || 28 Sep 2006 || 115 || align=left | Disc.: NEAT || 
|- id="2001 SO262" bgcolor=#FA8072
| 1 ||  || MCA || 17.5 || data-sort-value="0.94" | 940 m || multiple || 2001–2019 || 09 Feb 2019 || 45 || align=left | Disc.: LINEARAlt.: 2019 AS18 || 
|- id="2001 SO263" bgcolor=#FFC2E0
| 0 ||  || AMO || 22.20 || data-sort-value="0.13" | 130 m || multiple || 2001–2021 || 01 Nov 2021 || 77 || align=left | Disc.: LINEAR || 
|- id="2001 SP263" bgcolor=#FFC2E0
| 7 ||  || APO || 25.7 || data-sort-value="0.026" | 26 m || single || 5 days || 26 Sep 2001 || 14 || align=left | Disc.: LINEAR || 
|- id="2001 SQ263" bgcolor=#FFC2E0
| 3 ||  || ATE || 22.4 || data-sort-value="0.12" | 120 m || multiple || 2001–2017 || 09 Jan 2017 || 60 || align=left | Disc.: LONEOS || 
|- id="2001 SR263" bgcolor=#FFC2E0
| 2 ||  || AMO || 20.3 || data-sort-value="0.31" | 310 m || multiple || 2001–2018 || 10 Nov 2018 || 88 || align=left | Disc.: NEAT || 
|- id="2001 SV263" bgcolor=#fefefe
| 1 ||  || MBA-I || 18.4 || data-sort-value="0.62" | 620 m || multiple || 2001–2016 || 06 Jul 2016 || 48 || align=left | Disc.: LINEAR || 
|- id="2001 SL264" bgcolor=#FFC2E0
| 6 ||  || AMO || 19.5 || data-sort-value="0.45" | 450 m || single || 36 days || 17 Oct 2001 || 21 || align=left | Disc.: LINEAR || 
|- id="2001 SU268" bgcolor=#fefefe
| 0 ||  || MBA-I || 18.9 || data-sort-value="0.49" | 490 m || multiple || 2001–2021 || 07 Feb 2021 || 31 || align=left | Disc.: SpacewatchAdded on 21 August 2021 || 
|- id="2001 SD269" bgcolor=#E9E9E9
| 1 ||  || MBA-M || 18.0 || data-sort-value="0.75" | 750 m || multiple || 2001–2021 || 11 Aug 2021 || 60 || align=left | Disc.: SpacewatchAlt.: 2016 GH106 || 
|- id="2001 SE269" bgcolor=#fefefe
| 0 ||  || MBA-I || 18.59 || data-sort-value="0.57" | 570 m || multiple || 2001–2021 || 09 May 2021 || 89 || align=left | Disc.: Spacewatch || 
|- id="2001 SQ269" bgcolor=#E9E9E9
| 0 ||  || MBA-M || 17.5 || 1.8 km || multiple || 2001–2020 || 14 Dec 2020 || 67 || align=left | Disc.: SpacewatchAdded on 22 July 2020 || 
|- id="2001 ST269" bgcolor=#E9E9E9
| 3 ||  || MBA-M || 19.2 || data-sort-value="0.43" | 430 m || multiple || 2001–2005 || 06 Oct 2005 || 16 || align=left | Disc.: Spacewatch || 
|- id="2001 SX269" bgcolor=#FFC2E0
| 2 ||  || AMO || 21.7 || data-sort-value="0.16" | 160 m || multiple || 2001–2019 || 29 Sep 2019 || 33 || align=left | Disc.: LINEAR || 
|- id="2001 SY269" bgcolor=#FFC2E0
| 2 ||  || APO || 21.5 || data-sort-value="0.18" | 180 m || multiple || 2001–2004 || 31 Mar 2004 || 112 || align=left | Disc.: LINEARPotentially hazardous object || 
|- id="2001 SZ269" bgcolor=#FFC2E0
| 0 ||  || APO || 19.82 || data-sort-value="0.43" | 400 m || multiple || 2001–2023 || 24 Feb 2023 || 150 || align=left | Disc.: LINEARPotentially hazardous object || 
|- id="2001 SD270" bgcolor=#FFC2E0
| – ||  || AMO || 21.4 || data-sort-value="0.19" | 190 m || single || 10 days || 06 Oct 2001 || 27 || align=left | Disc.: LINEAR || 
|- id="2001 SE270" bgcolor=#FFC2E0
| 8 ||  || APO || 25.1 || data-sort-value="0.034" | 34 m || single || 2 days || 27 Sep 2001 || 16 || align=left | Disc.: LINEAR || 
|- id="2001 SH272" bgcolor=#FA8072
| 1 ||  || MCA || 19.1 || data-sort-value="0.45" | 450 m || multiple || 2001–2019 || 27 Oct 2019 || 57 || align=left | Disc.: LINEAR || 
|- id="2001 SU273" bgcolor=#E9E9E9
| 0 ||  || MBA-M || 17.2 || 2.0 km || multiple || 2001–2021 || 09 Jan 2021 || 85 || align=left | Disc.: Spacewatch || 
|- id="2001 SQ274" bgcolor=#fefefe
| 0 ||  || MBA-I || 17.8 || data-sort-value="0.82" | 820 m || multiple || 2001–2021 || 09 Jan 2021 || 87 || align=left | Disc.: LPL/Spacewatch II || 
|- id="2001 SW274" bgcolor=#E9E9E9
| 0 ||  || MBA-M || 17.98 || 1.4 km || multiple || 2001–2021 || 07 Feb 2021 || 42 || align=left | Disc.: LPL/Spacewatch IIAdded on 11 May 2021 || 
|- id="2001 SE275" bgcolor=#d6d6d6
| 0 ||  || MBA-O || 17.71 || 1.6 km || multiple || 2001–2021 || 07 Jun 2021 || 54 || align=left | Disc.: SpacewatchAlt.: 2017 SK35 || 
|- id="2001 SG275" bgcolor=#E9E9E9
| 2 ||  || MBA-M || 18.4 || data-sort-value="0.88" | 880 m || multiple || 2001–2018 || 10 Jul 2018 || 40 || align=left | Disc.: SpacewatchAlt.: 2014 RF26 || 
|- id="2001 SJ275" bgcolor=#FA8072
| 2 ||  || MCA || 18.5 || data-sort-value="0.59" | 590 m || multiple || 2001–2020 || 26 May 2020 || 58 || align=left | Disc.: Spacewatch || 
|- id="2001 SL275" bgcolor=#E9E9E9
| 0 ||  || MBA-M || 17.8 || data-sort-value="0.82" | 820 m || multiple || 2001–2021 || 05 Jun 2021 || 83 || align=left | Disc.: SpacewatchAdded on 17 June 2021Alt.: 2004 FS73 || 
|- id="2001 SH276" bgcolor=#FFC2E0
| 2 ||  || APO || 19.6 || data-sort-value="0.43" | 430 m || multiple || 2001–2020 || 12 Oct 2020 || 286 || align=left | Disc.: LINEAR || 
|- id="2001 SY283" bgcolor=#fefefe
| 9 ||  || MBA-I || 19.32 || data-sort-value="0.41" | 410 m || single || 4 days || 23 Sep 2001 || 13 || align=left | Disc.: SpacewatchAdded on 9 March 2021 || 
|- id="2001 SF284" bgcolor=#E9E9E9
| 0 ||  || MBA-M || 17.66 || 1.2 km || multiple || 2001–2021 || 14 Apr 2021 || 100 || align=left | Disc.: LPL/Spacewatch IIAlt.: 2014 ST280 || 
|- id="2001 SK284" bgcolor=#fefefe
| 5 ||  || MBA-I || 19.0 || data-sort-value="0.47" | 470 m || multiple || 2001–2019 || 05 Nov 2019 || 24 || align=left | Disc.: LPL/Spacewatch II || 
|- id="2001 SL284" bgcolor=#fefefe
| 1 ||  || MBA-I || 19.3 || data-sort-value="0.41" | 410 m || multiple || 2001–2020 || 20 Oct 2020 || 60 || align=left | Disc.: LPL/Spacewatch IIAlt.: 2005 UQ339 || 
|- id="2001 SQ284" bgcolor=#fefefe
| 0 ||  || MBA-I || 17.62 || data-sort-value="0.89" | 890 m || multiple || 2001–2021 || 09 May 2021 || 138 || align=left | Disc.: LPL/Spacewatch II || 
|- id="2001 SY284" bgcolor=#E9E9E9
| 0 ||  || MBA-M || 17.22 || 1.5 km || multiple || 1999–2021 || 03 May 2021 || 168 || align=left | Disc.: SpacewatchAlt.: 2008 HY40, 2017 HW39 || 
|- id="2001 SD286" bgcolor=#FFC2E0
| 7 ||  || APO || 25.3 || data-sort-value="0.031" | 31 m || single || 5 days || 29 Sep 2001 || 18 || align=left | Disc.: LINEAR || 
|- id="2001 SG286" bgcolor=#FFC2E0
| 0 ||  || APO || 21.0 || data-sort-value="0.22" | 220 m || multiple || 2001–2020 || 14 Nov 2020 || 217 || align=left | Disc.: LINEARPotentially hazardous object || 
|- id="2001 SD287" bgcolor=#d6d6d6
| 0 ||  || MBA-O || 16.06 || 3.4 km || multiple || 2001–2021 || 18 May 2021 || 87 || align=left | Disc.: NEAT || 
|- id="2001 SS287" bgcolor=#FFC2E0
| 0 ||  || AMO || 18.3 || data-sort-value="0.78" | 780 m || multiple || 2001–2007 || 14 Jun 2007 || 82 || align=left | Disc.: LINEAR || 
|- id="2001 SY289" bgcolor=#E9E9E9
| 0 ||  || MBA-M || 17.4 || 1.4 km || multiple || 2001–2020 || 25 Feb 2020 || 110 || align=left | Disc.: NEAT || 
|- id="2001 SG290" bgcolor=#E9E9E9
| 0 ||  || MBA-M || 16.31 || 2.3 km || multiple || 2001–2021 || 12 May 2021 || 223 || align=left | Disc.: NEATAlt.: 2010 XG88 || 
|- id="2001 SH290" bgcolor=#d6d6d6
| 0 ||  || MBA-O || 16.38 || 2.9 km || multiple || 2001–2021 || 17 Apr 2021 || 65 || align=left | Disc.: NEAT || 
|- id="2001 SD291" bgcolor=#C2E0FF
| E ||  || TNO || 8.2 || 76 km || single || 86 days || 12 Dec 2001 || 8 || align=left | Disc.: Palomar Obs.LoUTNOs, cubewano (cold) || 
|- id="2001 SE291" bgcolor=#C2E0FF
| 7 ||  || TNO || 7.2 || 121 km || multiple || 2001–2003 || 20 Nov 2003 || 9 || align=left | Disc.: Palomar Obs.LoUTNOs, cubewano (cold) || 
|- id="2001 SK292" bgcolor=#d6d6d6
| 0 ||  || MBA-O || 16.28 || 3.1 km || multiple || 2001–2021 || 09 Apr 2021 || 126 || align=left | Disc.: LINEAR || 
|- id="2001 SW293" bgcolor=#E9E9E9
| 2 ||  || MBA-M || 18.9 || data-sort-value="0.70" | 700 m || multiple || 2001–2018 || 13 Dec 2018 || 48 || align=left | Disc.: LINEAR || 
|- id="2001 SA294" bgcolor=#E9E9E9
| 1 ||  || MBA-M || 17.6 || 1.3 km || multiple || 2001–2016 || 10 Feb 2016 || 57 || align=left | Disc.: LINEAR || 
|- id="2001 SF295" bgcolor=#d6d6d6
| 0 ||  || MBA-O || 16.57 || 2.7 km || multiple || 2001–2021 || 26 Aug 2021 || 150 || align=left | Disc.: LINEARAlt.: 2010 LN121 || 
|- id="2001 SO296" bgcolor=#E9E9E9
| 1 ||  || MBA-M || 17.4 || data-sort-value="0.98" | 980 m || multiple || 2001–2019 || 23 Apr 2019 || 38 || align=left | Disc.: LINEARAlt.: 2015 DK221 || 
|- id="2001 SC297" bgcolor=#fefefe
| 0 ||  || MBA-I || 18.6 || data-sort-value="0.57" | 570 m || multiple || 2001–2020 || 21 Jan 2020 || 66 || align=left | Disc.: LINEAR || 
|- id="2001 SP297" bgcolor=#fefefe
| 1 ||  || MBA-I || 18.5 || data-sort-value="0.59" | 590 m || multiple || 2001–2020 || 16 Oct 2020 || 64 || align=left | Disc.: LINEARAlt.: 2005 UV362 || 
|- id="2001 SB298" bgcolor=#fefefe
| 0 ||  || MBA-I || 18.21 || data-sort-value="0.68" | 680 m || multiple || 2001–2021 || 07 Apr 2021 || 104 || align=left | Disc.: LINEAR || 
|- id="2001 SF298" bgcolor=#E9E9E9
| 0 ||  || MBA-M || 17.8 || 1.2 km || multiple || 2001–2020 || 05 Jan 2020 || 83 || align=left | Disc.: LINEARAlt.: 2010 VL32 || 
|- id="2001 SP298" bgcolor=#d6d6d6
| 0 ||  || MBA-O || 16.9 || 2.3 km || multiple || 2001–2018 || 06 Oct 2018 || 52 || align=left | Disc.: LINEAR || 
|- id="2001 SV298" bgcolor=#fefefe
| 0 ||  || MBA-I || 18.1 || data-sort-value="0.71" | 710 m || multiple || 2001–2019 || 30 Nov 2019 || 109 || align=left | Disc.: LINEARAlt.: 2012 VK79 || 
|- id="2001 SG299" bgcolor=#E9E9E9
| 3 ||  || MBA-M || 17.6 || data-sort-value="0.90" | 900 m || multiple || 2001–2018 || 31 Dec 2018 || 48 || align=left | Disc.: LINEAR || 
|- id="2001 SH299" bgcolor=#fefefe
| 0 ||  || MBA-I || 17.8 || data-sort-value="0.82" | 820 m || multiple || 2000–2021 || 14 Jun 2021 || 111 || align=left | Disc.: LINEAR || 
|- id="2001 SX299" bgcolor=#E9E9E9
| 1 ||  || MBA-M || 18.0 || 1.4 km || multiple || 2001–2019 || 04 Nov 2019 || 39 || align=left | Disc.: LINEAR || 
|- id="2001 SZ299" bgcolor=#E9E9E9
| 0 ||  || MBA-M || 17.1 || 2.1 km || multiple || 2001–2021 || 05 Jan 2021 || 88 || align=left | Disc.: LINEAR || 
|- id="2001 SE300" bgcolor=#E9E9E9
| 0 ||  || MBA-M || 17.5 || 1.3 km || multiple || 2001–2020 || 21 Jan 2020 || 60 || align=left | Disc.: LINEARAlt.: 2014 QL19 || 
|- id="2001 SH300" bgcolor=#fefefe
| 0 ||  || MBA-I || 18.64 || data-sort-value="0.56" | 560 m || multiple || 2001–2021 || 15 Apr 2021 || 77 || align=left | Disc.: LINEARAlt.: 2008 SC77 || 
|- id="2001 SO300" bgcolor=#E9E9E9
| 1 ||  || MBA-M || 18.16 || 1.3 km || multiple || 1992–2019 || 22 Oct 2019 || 51 || align=left | Disc.: LINEARAlt.: 2010 LC77 || 
|- id="2001 SY300" bgcolor=#d6d6d6
| 0 ||  || MBA-O || 16.74 || 2.5 km || multiple || 1999–2021 || 03 Dec 2021 || 160 || align=left | Disc.: LINEARAlt.: 2006 TW || 
|- id="2001 SH301" bgcolor=#E9E9E9
| 2 ||  || MBA-M || 18.4 || data-sort-value="0.88" | 880 m || multiple || 2001–2018 || 15 Oct 2018 || 59 || align=left | Disc.: LINEARAlt.: 2014 WZ189 || 
|- id="2001 SK301" bgcolor=#d6d6d6
| 1 ||  || MBA-O || 17.0 || 2.2 km || multiple || 2001–2020 || 01 Jan 2020 || 46 || align=left | Disc.: LINEAR || 
|- id="2001 SM301" bgcolor=#d6d6d6
| 0 ||  || MBA-O || 16.7 || 2.5 km || multiple || 2001–2020 || 19 Jan 2020 || 57 || align=left | Disc.: LINEAR || 
|- id="2001 SR301" bgcolor=#fefefe
| 0 ||  || MBA-I || 18.0 || data-sort-value="0.75" | 750 m || multiple || 2001–2020 || 20 Oct 2020 || 107 || align=left | Disc.: LINEAR || 
|- id="2001 SE302" bgcolor=#E9E9E9
| 1 ||  || MBA-M || 17.6 || 1.7 km || multiple || 2001–2019 || 01 Nov 2019 || 115 || align=left | Disc.: LINEAR || 
|- id="2001 SG302" bgcolor=#E9E9E9
| 0 ||  || MBA-M || 17.3 || 1.9 km || multiple || 2001–2019 || 15 Nov 2019 || 88 || align=left | Disc.: LINEARAlt.: 2010 TV128, 2015 TY90 || 
|- id="2001 SH303" bgcolor=#E9E9E9
| 0 ||  || MBA-M || 17.8 || 1.2 km || multiple || 2001–2018 || 13 Sep 2018 || 77 || align=left | Disc.: LINEARAlt.: 2014 UR189 || 
|- id="2001 SL303" bgcolor=#E9E9E9
| 0 ||  || MBA-M || 18.00 || data-sort-value="0.75" | 750 m || multiple || 2001–2021 || 14 Jun 2021 || 61 || align=left | Disc.: LINEAR || 
|- id="2001 SM303" bgcolor=#E9E9E9
| 1 ||  || MBA-M || 17.7 || 1.2 km || multiple || 2001–2019 || 29 Nov 2019 || 71 || align=left | Disc.: LINEARAlt.: 2014 SV135 || 
|- id="2001 SB304" bgcolor=#FA8072
| 1 ||  || MCA || 18.7 || data-sort-value="0.54" | 540 m || multiple || 2001–2019 || 08 Nov 2019 || 47 || align=left | Disc.: LINEARAlt.: 2008 UP56 || 
|- id="2001 SC304" bgcolor=#fefefe
| 0 ||  || MBA-I || 18.7 || data-sort-value="0.54" | 540 m || multiple || 2001–2020 || 23 Jun 2020 || 76 || align=left | Disc.: LINEARAlt.: 2014 TT46 || 
|- id="2001 SQ304" bgcolor=#E9E9E9
| 2 ||  || MBA-M || 18.1 || 1.3 km || multiple || 2001–2019 || 20 Dec 2019 || 40 || align=left | Disc.: LINEAR || 
|- id="2001 SS304" bgcolor=#FA8072
| 1 ||  || MCA || 19.1 || data-sort-value="0.45" | 450 m || multiple || 2001–2018 || 07 Aug 2018 || 39 || align=left | Disc.: LINEAR || 
|- id="2001 SD305" bgcolor=#fefefe
| 0 ||  || MBA-I || 18.15 || data-sort-value="0.70" | 700 m || multiple || 2001–2021 || 15 Apr 2021 || 114 || align=left | Disc.: LINEARAlt.: 2001 TU197 || 
|- id="2001 SO305" bgcolor=#fefefe
| 0 ||  || MBA-I || 18.0 || data-sort-value="0.75" | 750 m || multiple || 2001–2019 || 26 Nov 2019 || 93 || align=left | Disc.: LINEARAlt.: 2012 TA137 || 
|- id="2001 SD306" bgcolor=#d6d6d6
| 0 ||  || MBA-O || 16.64 || 2.6 km || multiple || 2001–2021 || 15 Apr 2021 || 96 || align=left | Disc.: LINEAR || 
|- id="2001 SZ307" bgcolor=#FA8072
| 1 ||  || MCA || 19.7 || data-sort-value="0.34" | 340 m || multiple || 2001–2017 || 30 Jul 2017 || 47 || align=left | Disc.: LINEARAlt.: 2014 UE67 || 
|- id="2001 SG308" bgcolor=#fefefe
| 0 ||  || MBA-I || 17.93 || data-sort-value="0.77" | 770 m || multiple || 2001–2021 || 11 May 2021 || 114 || align=left | Disc.: LINEAR || 
|- id="2001 SM308" bgcolor=#fefefe
| 0 ||  || MBA-I || 17.7 || data-sort-value="0.86" | 860 m || multiple || 2001–2021 || 11 Jan 2021 || 80 || align=left | Disc.: LINEARAlt.: 2012 TE137, 2014 FJ10 || 
|- id="2001 SR308" bgcolor=#E9E9E9
| 0 ||  || MBA-M || 16.81 || 2.4 km || multiple || 1999–2022 || 26 Jan 2022 || 203 || align=left | Disc.: SDSSAlt.: 1999 FQ64 || 
|- id="2001 SB309" bgcolor=#d6d6d6
| 0 ||  || MBA-O || 16.2 || 3.2 km || multiple || 2001–2020 || 26 May 2020 || 175 || align=left | Disc.: LINEARAlt.: 2015 HB15 || 
|- id="2001 SE309" bgcolor=#fefefe
| 1 ||  || MBA-I || 18.7 || data-sort-value="0.54" | 540 m || multiple || 2001–2019 || 08 Nov 2019 || 50 || align=left | Disc.: LINEAR || 
|- id="2001 SO309" bgcolor=#fefefe
| 1 ||  || MBA-I || 18.1 || data-sort-value="0.71" | 710 m || multiple || 2001–2019 || 20 Dec 2019 || 108 || align=left | Disc.: LINEAR || 
|- id="2001 SW309" bgcolor=#fefefe
| 1 ||  || MBA-I || 18.2 || data-sort-value="0.68" | 680 m || multiple || 2001–2019 || 25 Nov 2019 || 122 || align=left | Disc.: LINEAR || 
|- id="2001 ST312" bgcolor=#E9E9E9
| 0 ||  || MBA-M || 17.7 || 1.2 km || multiple || 2001–2020 || 22 Mar 2020 || 141 || align=left | Disc.: LINEAR || 
|- id="2001 SB313" bgcolor=#E9E9E9
| 0 ||  || MBA-M || 16.96 || 2.3 km || multiple || 2001–2021 || 14 Apr 2021 || 193 || align=left | Disc.: LINEAR || 
|- id="2001 SN314" bgcolor=#d6d6d6
| 0 ||  || MBA-O || 15.6 || 4.2 km || multiple || 2001–2021 || 16 Jan 2021 || 140 || align=left | Disc.: LINEAR || 
|- id="2001 SO318" bgcolor=#fefefe
| 0 ||  || MBA-I || 18.3 || data-sort-value="0.65" | 650 m || multiple || 2001–2020 || 13 Nov 2020 || 110 || align=left | Disc.: LINEAR || 
|- id="2001 SE320" bgcolor=#fefefe
| 0 ||  || MBA-I || 18.23 || data-sort-value="0.67" | 670 m || multiple || 2001–2022 || 27 Jan 2022 || 124 || align=left | Disc.: LINEARAlt.: 2005 UB151 || 
|- id="2001 SH320" bgcolor=#E9E9E9
| 0 ||  || MBA-M || 17.4 || 1.8 km || multiple || 2001–2021 || 18 Jan 2021 || 187 || align=left | Disc.: LINEAR || 
|- id="2001 SK320" bgcolor=#d6d6d6
| – ||  || MBA-O || 16.2 || 3.2 km || single || 26 days || 17 Oct 2001 || 13 || align=left | Disc.: LINEAR || 
|- id="2001 SL320" bgcolor=#fefefe
| 1 ||  || MBA-I || 18.0 || data-sort-value="0.75" | 750 m || multiple || 2001–2019 || 28 Nov 2019 || 97 || align=left | Disc.: LINEAR || 
|- id="2001 SR321" bgcolor=#d6d6d6
| 0 ||  || MBA-O || 17.67 || 1.6 km || multiple || 1996–2021 || 30 Jun 2021 || 37 || align=left | Disc.: SpacewatchAlt.: 1996 VU13 || 
|- id="2001 SA322" bgcolor=#E9E9E9
| 3 ||  || MBA-M || 17.8 || 1.2 km || multiple || 2001–2018 || 10 Nov 2018 || 89 || align=left | Disc.: LINEARAlt.: 2018 RV28 || 
|- id="2001 SQ322" bgcolor=#d6d6d6
| 0 ||  || MBA-O || 15.95 || 4.8 km || multiple || 2001–2021 || 02 May 2021 || 193 || align=left | Disc.: LINEARAlt.: 2010 LJ80, 2012 TZ302 || 
|- id="2001 SV322" bgcolor=#fefefe
| 0 ||  || MBA-I || 17.98 || data-sort-value="0.75" | 750 m || multiple || 2001–2021 || 11 May 2021 || 115 || align=left | Disc.: LINEARAlt.: 2008 TH183 || 
|- id="2001 SZ322" bgcolor=#E9E9E9
| 0 ||  || MBA-M || 17.04 || 1.6 km || multiple || 2001–2021 || 11 Jun 2021 || 302 || align=left | Disc.: LINEARAlt.: 2008 GL116 || 
|- id="2001 SA323" bgcolor=#d6d6d6
| 0 ||  || MBA-O || 17.11 || 1.9 km || multiple || 2001–2021 || 01 Dec 2021 || 83 || align=left | Disc.: LINEARAlt.: 2010 PA3 || 
|- id="2001 SA324" bgcolor=#fefefe
| 2 ||  || MBA-I || 18.37 || data-sort-value="0.63" | 630 m || multiple || 2001–2022 || 25 Jan 2022 || 53 || align=left | Disc.: LINEAR || 
|- id="2001 SC326" bgcolor=#fefefe
| 0 ||  || MBA-I || 18.68 || data-sort-value="0.55" | 550 m || multiple || 2001–2021 || 02 Dec 2021 || 124 || align=left | Disc.: LPL/Spacewatch II || 
|- id="2001 SD326" bgcolor=#E9E9E9
| 0 ||  || MBA-M || 17.4 || 1.8 km || multiple || 2001–2021 || 08 Jan 2021 || 59 || align=left | Disc.: LPL/Spacewatch II || 
|- id="2001 SZ326" bgcolor=#d6d6d6
| – ||  || MBA-O || 18.7 || 1.0 km || single || 55 days || 12 Nov 2001 || 19 || align=left | Disc.: LPL/Spacewatch II || 
|- id="2001 SQ327" bgcolor=#fefefe
| 1 ||  || MBA-I || 18.0 || data-sort-value="0.75" | 750 m || multiple || 2001–2021 || 18 Jan 2021 || 43 || align=left | Disc.: LONEOS || 
|- id="2001 SP328" bgcolor=#E9E9E9
| 1 ||  || MBA-M || 17.98 || data-sort-value="0.75" | 750 m || multiple || 2001–2021 || 16 May 2021 || 33 || align=left | Disc.: LINEAR || 
|- id="2001 SA329" bgcolor=#E9E9E9
| 0 ||  || MBA-M || 16.8 || 1.3 km || multiple || 2001–2020 || 02 Feb 2020 || 122 || align=left | Disc.: LINEAR || 
|- id="2001 SP329" bgcolor=#E9E9E9
| 0 ||  || MBA-M || 17.73 || data-sort-value="0.85" | 850 m || multiple || 1997–2021 || 15 Apr 2021 || 92 || align=left | Disc.: LINEARAlt.: 2005 MM49, 2014 TB71 || 
|- id="2001 ST329" bgcolor=#fefefe
| 1 ||  || MBA-I || 18.3 || data-sort-value="0.65" | 650 m || multiple || 2001–2017 || 23 Jan 2017 || 51 || align=left | Disc.: LPL/Spacewatch IIAlt.: 2005 VU83 || 
|- id="2001 SB330" bgcolor=#E9E9E9
| 0 ||  || MBA-M || 17.0 || 2.2 km || multiple || 2001–2019 || 28 Dec 2019 || 152 || align=left | Disc.: LINEARAlt.: 2011 BO77 || 
|- id="2001 SJ330" bgcolor=#fefefe
| 2 ||  || MBA-I || 19.1 || data-sort-value="0.45" | 450 m || multiple || 2001–2018 || 08 Aug 2018 || 29 || align=left | Disc.: LINEAR || 
|- id="2001 SM330" bgcolor=#fefefe
| 0 ||  || MBA-I || 19.2 || data-sort-value="0.43" | 430 m || multiple || 2001–2020 || 21 Jan 2020 || 64 || align=left | Disc.: LINEAR || 
|- id="2001 SN330" bgcolor=#E9E9E9
| – ||  || MBA-M || 17.9 || 1.1 km || single || 5 days || 24 Sep 2001 || 10 || align=left | Disc.: LINEAR || 
|- id="2001 SP330" bgcolor=#d6d6d6
| 1 ||  || MBA-O || 16.9 || 2.3 km || multiple || 2001–2016 || 05 Apr 2016 || 39 || align=left | Disc.: SpacewatchAdded on 21 August 2021Alt.: 2012 QN66 || 
|- id="2001 SS330" bgcolor=#d6d6d6
| E ||  || MBA-O || 17.4 || 1.8 km || single || 5 days || 24 Sep 2001 || 14 || align=left | Disc.: LINEAR || 
|- id="2001 SW330" bgcolor=#fefefe
| 0 ||  || MBA-I || 18.2 || data-sort-value="0.68" | 680 m || multiple || 2001–2021 || 17 Jan 2021 || 84 || align=left | Disc.: LINEAR || 
|- id="2001 SF331" bgcolor=#E9E9E9
| 0 ||  || MBA-M || 17.70 || data-sort-value="0.86" | 860 m || multiple || 2001–2021 || 09 Jul 2021 || 44 || align=left | Disc.: LINEARAdded on 21 August 2021Alt.: 2016 CU181 || 
|- id="2001 SR331" bgcolor=#E9E9E9
| 0 ||  || MBA-M || 18.31 || data-sort-value="0.92" | 920 m || multiple || 2001–2021 || 11 Apr 2021 || 43 || align=left | Disc.: Spacewatch || 
|- id="2001 SO332" bgcolor=#E9E9E9
| 0 ||  || MBA-M || 17.5 || 1.8 km || multiple || 2001–2019 || 24 Aug 2019 || 38 || align=left | Disc.: SpacewatchAlt.: 2019 PO12 || 
|- id="2001 SS332" bgcolor=#fefefe
| 1 ||  || MBA-I || 18.6 || data-sort-value="0.57" | 570 m || multiple || 2001–2020 || 17 Oct 2020 || 57 || align=left | Disc.: Spacewatch || 
|- id="2001 SO333" bgcolor=#d6d6d6
| 1 ||  || MBA-O || 17.0 || 2.2 km || multiple || 2001–2020 || 25 Mar 2020 || 62 || align=left | Disc.: LINEAR || 
|- id="2001 SY333" bgcolor=#d6d6d6
| 1 ||  || MBA-O || 17.91 || 1.5 km || multiple || 2001–2017 || 17 Oct 2017 || 31 || align=left | Disc.: LPL/Spacewatch II || 
|- id="2001 SZ333" bgcolor=#fefefe
| 0 ||  || MBA-I || 18.6 || data-sort-value="0.57" | 570 m || multiple || 2001–2019 || 28 Aug 2019 || 58 || align=left | Disc.: Spacewatch || 
|- id="2001 SB334" bgcolor=#fefefe
| 0 ||  || MBA-I || 18.34 || data-sort-value="0.64" | 640 m || multiple || 2000–2021 || 15 Apr 2021 || 89 || align=left | Disc.: SpacewatchAlt.: 2008 UY8 || 
|- id="2001 SD335" bgcolor=#E9E9E9
| 0 ||  || MBA-M || 17.0 || 2.2 km || multiple || 2001–2021 || 11 Jan 2021 || 113 || align=left | Disc.: LINEAR || 
|- id="2001 SQ335" bgcolor=#E9E9E9
| 0 ||  || MBA-M || 16.66 || 2.0 km || multiple || 2001–2021 || 09 May 2021 || 189 || align=left | Disc.: LINEARAlt.: 2014 SX166 || 
|- id="2001 SY335" bgcolor=#E9E9E9
| 2 ||  || MBA-M || 18.3 || 1.2 km || multiple || 2001–2020 || 14 Nov 2020 || 44 || align=left | Disc.: SpacewatchAdded on 17 January 2021 || 
|- id="2001 SA336" bgcolor=#E9E9E9
| 0 ||  || MBA-M || 17.50 || data-sort-value="0.94" | 940 m || multiple || 2001–2021 || 24 Oct 2021 || 130 || align=left | Disc.: SpacewatchAlt.: 2016 JE7 || 
|- id="2001 SJ336" bgcolor=#d6d6d6
| 1 ||  || MBA-O || 17.48 || 1.8 km || multiple || 2001–2021 || 14 Jul 2021 || 40 || align=left | Disc.: LINEAR || 
|- id="2001 SW336" bgcolor=#d6d6d6
| 1 ||  || MBA-O || 17.1 || 2.1 km || multiple || 2001–2019 || 24 Dec 2019 || 26 || align=left | Disc.: LINEAR || 
|- id="2001 SB337" bgcolor=#fefefe
| 0 ||  || MBA-I || 19.17 || data-sort-value="0.44" | 440 m || multiple || 2001–2021 || 09 Nov 2021 || 63 || align=left | Disc.: LINEARAdded on 5 November 2021Alt.: 2011 SA157 || 
|- id="2001 SJ337" bgcolor=#fefefe
| 1 ||  || MBA-I || 19.43 || data-sort-value="0.39" | 390 m || multiple || 2001–2021 || 08 Sep 2021 || 50 || align=left | Disc.: LINEAR || 
|- id="2001 SO337" bgcolor=#E9E9E9
| 3 ||  || MBA-M || 18.8 || data-sort-value="0.97" | 970 m || multiple || 2001–2019 || 02 Nov 2019 || 69 || align=left | Disc.: LPL/Spacewatch IIAdded on 22 July 2020Alt.: 2019 TL11 || 
|- id="2001 SQ337" bgcolor=#FA8072
| E ||  || MCA || 19.5 || data-sort-value="0.37" | 370 m || single || 2 days || 21 Sep 2001 || 10 || align=left | Disc.: LPL/Spacewatch II || 
|- id="2001 SE338" bgcolor=#fefefe
| 0 ||  || MBA-I || 18.82 || data-sort-value="0.51" | 510 m || multiple || 2001–2021 || 24 Oct 2021 || 56 || align=left | Disc.: LINEARAdded on 30 September 2021Alt.: 2021 OY18 || 
|- id="2001 SH338" bgcolor=#fefefe
| 0 ||  || MBA-I || 19.1 || data-sort-value="0.45" | 450 m || multiple || 2001–2020 || 14 Nov 2020 || 80 || align=left | Disc.: LINEARAdded on 19 October 2020Alt.: 2013 HA68 || 
|- id="2001 SF340" bgcolor=#FA8072
| 0 ||  || MCA || 18.59 || data-sort-value="0.57" | 570 m || multiple || 2001–2018 || 09 Nov 2018 || 52 || align=left | Disc.: LONEOS || 
|- id="2001 SP340" bgcolor=#fefefe
| 0 ||  || MBA-I || 18.6 || data-sort-value="0.57" | 570 m || multiple || 2001–2016 || 08 Jun 2016 || 40 || align=left | Disc.: LINEAR || 
|- id="2001 SX340" bgcolor=#d6d6d6
| 0 ||  || MBA-O || 16.6 || 2.7 km || multiple || 2001–2018 || 06 Oct 2018 || 66 || align=left | Disc.: LINEARAlt.: 2005 GG18, 2007 UW142 || 
|- id="2001 SZ340" bgcolor=#E9E9E9
| 0 ||  || MBA-M || 17.5 || 1.8 km || multiple || 2001–2020 || 24 Oct 2020 || 110 || align=left | Disc.: LINEARAdded on 22 July 2020 || 
|- id="2001 SA341" bgcolor=#fefefe
| 1 ||  || MBA-I || 18.8 || data-sort-value="0.52" | 520 m || multiple || 2001–2020 || 08 Dec 2020 || 54 || align=left | Disc.: LINEAR || 
|- id="2001 SH343" bgcolor=#E9E9E9
| 1 ||  || MBA-M || 19.3 || data-sort-value="0.58" | 580 m || multiple || 2001–2019 || 06 Dec 2019 || 34 || align=left | Disc.: Spacewatch || 
|- id="2001 SW343" bgcolor=#E9E9E9
| 2 ||  || MBA-M || 17.9 || 1.1 km || multiple || 2001–2018 || 02 Nov 2018 || 80 || align=left | Disc.: Spacewatch || 
|- id="2001 SH344" bgcolor=#E9E9E9
| 3 ||  || MBA-M || 17.2 || 2.0 km || multiple || 2001–2019 || 25 Nov 2019 || 104 || align=left | Disc.: NEATAlt.: 2010 SY38 || 
|- id="2001 SJ346" bgcolor=#E9E9E9
| 0 ||  || MBA-M || 17.0 || 1.2 km || multiple || 2001–2018 || 31 Dec 2018 || 37 || align=left | Disc.: LINEAR || 
|- id="2001 SZ346" bgcolor=#E9E9E9
| 0 ||  || MBA-M || 16.6 || 2.7 km || multiple || 2001–2021 || 18 Jan 2021 || 188 || align=left | Disc.: LINEARAlt.: 2012 BT11 || 
|- id="2001 SO347" bgcolor=#E9E9E9
| 1 ||  || MBA-M || 18.06 || data-sort-value="0.73" | 730 m || multiple || 2001–2021 || 29 Jul 2021 || 64 || align=left | Disc.: LINEAR || 
|- id="2001 SY349" bgcolor=#fefefe
| 1 ||  || MBA-I || 18.6 || data-sort-value="0.57" | 570 m || multiple || 2001–2020 || 04 Jan 2020 || 80 || align=left | Disc.: LINEAR || 
|- id="2001 SC350" bgcolor=#E9E9E9
| – ||  || MBA-M || 18.8 || data-sort-value="0.52" | 520 m || single || 30 days || 20 Oct 2001 || 13 || align=left | Disc.: LINEAR || 
|- id="2001 SK351" bgcolor=#fefefe
| 0 ||  || MBA-I || 17.7 || data-sort-value="0.86" | 860 m || multiple || 2001–2021 || 12 Jan 2021 || 170 || align=left | Disc.: SDSS || 
|- id="2001 SP351" bgcolor=#E9E9E9
| 0 ||  || MBA-M || 17.75 || data-sort-value="0.84" | 840 m || multiple || 2001–2021 || 28 Oct 2021 || 50 || align=left | Disc.: SDSS || 
|- id="2001 SV351" bgcolor=#E9E9E9
| 0 ||  || MBA-M || 17.8 || data-sort-value="0.82" | 820 m || multiple || 2001–2020 || 25 May 2020 || 36 || align=left | Disc.: SDSS || 
|- id="2001 SX351" bgcolor=#E9E9E9
| 0 ||  || MBA-M || 17.1 || 1.6 km || multiple || 2001–2021 || 22 May 2021 || 85 || align=left | Disc.: SDSSAlt.: 2014 WA375, 2014 WG125, 2016 CC239 || 
|- id="2001 SZ351" bgcolor=#d6d6d6
| 0 ||  || MBA-O || 16.85 || 2.4 km || multiple || 2001–2021 || 31 May 2021 || 35 || align=left | Disc.: SDSSAlt.: 2021 GQ88 || 
|- id="2001 SY352" bgcolor=#fefefe
| 0 ||  || MBA-I || 18.4 || data-sort-value="0.62" | 620 m || multiple || 2001–2019 || 19 Sep 2019 || 54 || align=left | Disc.: LINEAR || 
|- id="2001 SV353" bgcolor=#fefefe
| 1 ||  || MBA-I || 18.4 || data-sort-value="0.62" | 620 m || multiple || 2001–2020 || 19 Jan 2020 || 75 || align=left | Disc.: LINEAR || 
|- id="2001 SB354" bgcolor=#E9E9E9
| 0 ||  || MBA-M || 17.1 || 2.1 km || multiple || 2001–2019 || 28 Dec 2019 || 134 || align=left | Disc.: NEAT || 
|- id="2001 SF354" bgcolor=#d6d6d6
| 0 ||  || MBA-O || 16.8 || 2.4 km || multiple || 2001–2020 || 21 Jun 2020 || 85 || align=left | Disc.: SDSS || 
|- id="2001 SK354" bgcolor=#d6d6d6
| 0 ||  || MBA-O || 17.51 || 1.8 km || multiple || 2001-2022 || 24 Dec 2022 || 105 || align=left | Disc.: NEATAlt.: 2022 QJ191 || 
|- id="2001 SP354" bgcolor=#d6d6d6
| 1 ||  || MBA-O || 16.6 || 2.7 km || multiple || 2001–2019 || 04 Feb 2019 || 68 || align=left | Disc.: NEATAlt.: 2012 XO46 || 
|- id="2001 SW354" bgcolor=#d6d6d6
| 0 ||  || MBA-O || 16.9 || 2.3 km || multiple || 2001–2020 || 16 Apr 2020 || 65 || align=left | Disc.: SDSS || 
|- id="2001 SX354" bgcolor=#fefefe
| 0 ||  || MBA-I || 17.90 || data-sort-value="0.78" | 780 m || multiple || 2001–2022 || 24 Jan 2022 || 53 || align=left | Disc.: NEAT || 
|- id="2001 SG355" bgcolor=#C2FFFF
| 0 ||  || JT || 14.0 || 8.8 km || multiple || 2001–2020 || 23 Jun 2020 || 117 || align=left | Disc.: SDSSTrojan camp (L5) || 
|- id="2001 SH355" bgcolor=#d6d6d6
| 0 ||  || MBA-O || 16.86 || 2.4 km || multiple || 2001–2021 || 30 Jul 2021 || 93 || align=left | Disc.: SDSS || 
|- id="2001 SJ355" bgcolor=#fefefe
| 0 ||  || MBA-I || 17.57 || data-sort-value="0.91" | 910 m || multiple || 2001–2021 || 06 May 2021 || 149 || align=left | Disc.: SDSS || 
|- id="2001 SM355" bgcolor=#E9E9E9
| 0 ||  || MBA-M || 17.49 || data-sort-value="0.94" | 940 m || multiple || 2001–2021 || 11 Oct 2021 || 212 || align=left | Disc.: NEAT || 
|- id="2001 SS355" bgcolor=#E9E9E9
| 0 ||  || MBA-M || 18.89 || data-sort-value="0.70" | 700 m || multiple || 2001–2019 || 02 Jan 2019 || 43 || align=left | Disc.: NEATAlt.: 2018 VK61 || 
|- id="2001 SU355" bgcolor=#E9E9E9
| 0 ||  || MBA-M || 17.59 || 1.3 km || multiple || 2001–2021 || 18 Apr 2021 || 112 || align=left | Disc.: NEAT || 
|- id="2001 SW355" bgcolor=#d6d6d6
| 0 ||  || MBA-O || 16.56 || 2.7 km || multiple || 1995–2021 || 07 Jun 2021 || 167 || align=left | Disc.: NEATAlt.: 2006 SH187 || 
|- id="2001 SA356" bgcolor=#E9E9E9
| 0 ||  || MBA-M || 17.11 || 1.6 km || multiple || 1992–2021 || 06 Apr 2021 || 142 || align=left | Disc.: NEATAlt.: 2013 JB11 || 
|- id="2001 SB356" bgcolor=#fefefe
| 0 ||  || MBA-I || 17.97 || data-sort-value="0.76" | 760 m || multiple || 2001–2022 || 26 Jan 2022 || 107 || align=left | Disc.: NEATAlt.: 2005 UL419, 2009 WN128 || 
|- id="2001 SF356" bgcolor=#E9E9E9
| 0 ||  || MBA-M || 18.0 || 1.1 km || multiple || 2001–2020 || 03 Jan 2020 || 43 || align=left | Disc.: NEAT || 
|- id="2001 SJ356" bgcolor=#d6d6d6
| 0 ||  || MBA-O || 17.6 || 1.7 km || multiple || 2001–2017 || 08 Dec 2017 || 23 || align=left | Disc.: SDSSAdded on 22 July 2020 || 
|- id="2001 SP356" bgcolor=#fefefe
| 0 ||  || MBA-I || 17.6 || data-sort-value="0.90" | 900 m || multiple || 2001–2021 || 07 Jan 2021 || 135 || align=left | Disc.: NEAT || 
|- id="2001 SQ356" bgcolor=#E9E9E9
| 0 ||  || MBA-M || 16.68 || 1.9 km || multiple || 2001–2021 || 14 May 2021 || 247 || align=left | Disc.: NEATAlt.: 2001 TQ131 || 
|- id="2001 SU356" bgcolor=#fefefe
| 0 ||  || MBA-I || 18.69 || data-sort-value="0.54" | 540 m || multiple || 2001–2021 || 03 Dec 2021 || 110 || align=left | Disc.: NEATAlt.: 2011 ST97 || 
|- id="2001 SV356" bgcolor=#FA8072
| 1 ||  || MCA || 17.9 || data-sort-value="0.78" | 780 m || multiple || 2001–2018 || 10 Dec 2018 || 43 || align=left | Disc.: NEATAlt.: 2005 MJ46 || 
|- id="2001 SW356" bgcolor=#E9E9E9
| 0 ||  || MBA-M || 16.41 || 1.6 km || multiple || 1997–2021 || 31 Oct 2021 || 253 || align=left | Disc.: NEATAlt.: 2004 GU38, 2014 WV418 || 
|- id="2001 SX356" bgcolor=#d6d6d6
| 0 ||  || MBA-O || 16.09 || 3.4 km || multiple || 2001–2021 || 01 Sep 2021 || 167 || align=left | Disc.: NEATAlt.: 2010 PP45, 2015 MM20, 2016 RG24 || 
|- id="2001 SY356" bgcolor=#fefefe
| 0 ||  || MBA-I || 18.35 || data-sort-value="0.64" | 640 m || multiple || 2001–2021 || 27 Nov 2021 || 142 || align=left | Disc.: NEAT || 
|- id="2001 SZ356" bgcolor=#fefefe
| 0 ||  || MBA-I || 17.5 || data-sort-value="0.94" | 940 m || multiple || 2001–2020 || 10 Oct 2020 || 121 || align=left | Disc.: NEATAlt.: 2015 HO167 || 
|- id="2001 SA357" bgcolor=#E9E9E9
| 1 ||  || MBA-M || 17.5 || data-sort-value="0.94" | 940 m || multiple || 2001–2014 || 26 Dec 2014 || 52 || align=left | Disc.: LONEOS || 
|- id="2001 SC357" bgcolor=#E9E9E9
| 0 ||  || MBA-M || 16.86 || 1.3 km || multiple || 2001–2020 || 25 Apr 2020 || 168 || align=left | Disc.: SDSS || 
|- id="2001 SD357" bgcolor=#d6d6d6
| 0 ||  || MBA-O || 16.38 || 2.9 km || multiple || 2001–2021 || 23 Oct 2021 || 144 || align=left | Disc.: SDSS || 
|- id="2001 SF357" bgcolor=#fefefe
| 0 ||  || MBA-I || 17.5 || data-sort-value="0.94" | 940 m || multiple || 2001–2021 || 16 Jan 2021 || 100 || align=left | Disc.: Spacewatch || 
|- id="2001 SG357" bgcolor=#d6d6d6
| 0 ||  || MBA-O || 17.03 || 2.2 km || multiple || 2001–2021 || 24 Nov 2021 || 121 || align=left | Disc.: SDSS || 
|- id="2001 SH357" bgcolor=#E9E9E9
| 0 ||  || MBA-M || 17.70 || 1.2 km || multiple || 2001–2021 || 12 May 2021 || 100 || align=left | Disc.: NEAT || 
|- id="2001 SN357" bgcolor=#fefefe
| 0 ||  || MBA-I || 18.32 || data-sort-value="0.64" | 640 m || multiple || 2001–2020 || 09 Dec 2020 || 92 || align=left | Disc.: Spacewatch || 
|- id="2001 SP357" bgcolor=#fefefe
| 0 ||  || MBA-I || 17.3 || 1.0 km || multiple || 2001–2020 || 14 Feb 2020 || 124 || align=left | Disc.: NEAT || 
|- id="2001 SR357" bgcolor=#fefefe
| 0 ||  || MBA-I || 18.22 || data-sort-value="0.67" | 670 m || multiple || 2001–2022 || 25 Jan 2022 || 82 || align=left | Disc.: SDSS || 
|- id="2001 ST357" bgcolor=#d6d6d6
| 0 ||  || MBA-O || 16.59 || 2.7 km || multiple || 2001–2021 || 11 May 2021 || 95 || align=left | Disc.: LPL/Spacewatch II || 
|- id="2001 SU357" bgcolor=#fefefe
| 0 ||  || MBA-I || 17.79 || data-sort-value="0.82" | 820 m || multiple || 2001–2021 || 11 May 2021 || 119 || align=left | Disc.: LPL/Spacewatch II || 
|- id="2001 SW357" bgcolor=#E9E9E9
| 0 ||  || MBA-M || 16.8 || 1.8 km || multiple || 2001–2021 || 15 Jan 2021 || 82 || align=left | Disc.: SDSS || 
|- id="2001 SX357" bgcolor=#fefefe
| 0 ||  || MBA-I || 18.45 || data-sort-value="0.61" | 610 m || multiple || 2001–2022 || 27 Jan 2022 || 78 || align=left | Disc.: SDSS || 
|- id="2001 SZ357" bgcolor=#E9E9E9
| 0 ||  || MBA-M || 17.32 || 1.0 km || multiple || 2001–2021 || 13 Jun 2021 || 104 || align=left | Disc.: NEAT || 
|- id="2001 SA358" bgcolor=#d6d6d6
| 0 ||  || MBA-O || 16.9 || 2.3 km || multiple || 2001–2020 || 26 May 2020 || 87 || align=left | Disc.: SDSS || 
|- id="2001 SB358" bgcolor=#d6d6d6
| 0 ||  || MBA-O || 16.8 || 2.4 km || multiple || 2001–2019 || 22 Apr 2019 || 62 || align=left | Disc.: SDSS || 
|- id="2001 SC358" bgcolor=#E9E9E9
| 0 ||  || MBA-M || 17.39 || 1.4 km || multiple || 2001–2021 || 08 May 2021 || 96 || align=left | Disc.: SDSSAlt.: 2016 BL56 || 
|- id="2001 SF358" bgcolor=#d6d6d6
| 0 ||  || MBA-O || 16.26 || 3.1 km || multiple || 2001–2021 || 13 May 2021 || 100 || align=left | Disc.: SDSSAlt.: 2010 LJ98 || 
|- id="2001 SH358" bgcolor=#d6d6d6
| 0 ||  || MBA-O || 16.1 || 3.4 km || multiple || 2001–2019 || 29 Oct 2019 || 85 || align=left | Disc.: SDSS || 
|- id="2001 SL358" bgcolor=#E9E9E9
| 0 ||  || MBA-M || 17.76 || 1.6 km || multiple || 2001–2021 || 06 Apr 2021 || 77 || align=left | Disc.: SDSS || 
|- id="2001 SM358" bgcolor=#fefefe
| 0 ||  || MBA-I || 17.0 || 1.2 km || multiple || 2001–2020 || 25 Dec 2020 || 63 || align=left | Disc.: NEAT || 
|- id="2001 SN358" bgcolor=#d6d6d6
| 0 ||  || MBA-O || 16.90 || 2.3 km || multiple || 2001–2021 || 07 Jul 2021 || 84 || align=left | Disc.: Spacewatch || 
|- id="2001 SO358" bgcolor=#E9E9E9
| 0 ||  || MBA-M || 16.97 || 1.7 km || multiple || 2001–2021 || 12 May 2021 || 92 || align=left | Disc.: SDSSAlt.: 2016 BO66 || 
|- id="2001 SP358" bgcolor=#d6d6d6
| 0 ||  || HIL || 15.14 || 5.2 km || multiple || 2001–2021 || 10 Apr 2021 || 62 || align=left | Disc.: SDSS || 
|- id="2001 SR358" bgcolor=#fefefe
| 0 ||  || MBA-I || 18.0 || data-sort-value="0.75" | 750 m || multiple || 2001–2021 || 06 Jan 2021 || 141 || align=left | Disc.: SDSS || 
|- id="2001 SS358" bgcolor=#FA8072
| 0 ||  || MCA || 18.52 || data-sort-value="0.59" | 590 m || multiple || 2001–2021 || 29 Nov 2021 || 66 || align=left | Disc.: SDSS || 
|- id="2001 ST358" bgcolor=#d6d6d6
| 0 ||  || MBA-O || 16.63 || 2.6 km || multiple || 2001–2021 || 15 May 2021 || 108 || align=left | Disc.: SDSS || 
|- id="2001 SU358" bgcolor=#E9E9E9
| 0 ||  || MBA-M || 17.7 || data-sort-value="0.86" | 860 m || multiple || 2001–2020 || 23 Mar 2020 || 56 || align=left | Disc.: Spacewatch || 
|- id="2001 SV358" bgcolor=#d6d6d6
| 0 ||  || MBA-O || 16.8 || 2.4 km || multiple || 2001–2019 || 04 Apr 2019 || 45 || align=left | Disc.: SDSS || 
|- id="2001 SW358" bgcolor=#E9E9E9
| 0 ||  || MBA-M || 17.4 || 1.4 km || multiple || 2001–2020 || 27 Jan 2020 || 58 || align=left | Disc.: SDSSAlt.: 2016 AV163 || 
|- id="2001 SX358" bgcolor=#E9E9E9
| 0 ||  || MBA-M || 17.2 || 1.5 km || multiple || 2001–2020 || 24 Mar 2020 || 107 || align=left | Disc.: SDSSAlt.: 2016 BU5 || 
|- id="2001 SY358" bgcolor=#fefefe
| 0 ||  || MBA-I || 18.1 || data-sort-value="0.71" | 710 m || multiple || 2001–2019 || 18 Sep 2019 || 67 || align=left | Disc.: Spacewatch || 
|- id="2001 SZ358" bgcolor=#fefefe
| 0 ||  || MBA-I || 18.09 || data-sort-value="0.72" | 720 m || multiple || 2001–2022 || 26 Jan 2022 || 52 || align=left | Disc.: SDSS || 
|- id="2001 SA359" bgcolor=#E9E9E9
| 1 ||  || MBA-M || 18.21 || data-sort-value="0.68" | 680 m || multiple || 2001–2021 || 12 Aug 2021 || 49 || align=left | Disc.: SDSS || 
|- id="2001 SB359" bgcolor=#E9E9E9
| 0 ||  || MBA-M || 17.3 || 1.9 km || multiple || 2001–2021 || 04 Jan 2021 || 58 || align=left | Disc.: Spacewatch || 
|- id="2001 SC359" bgcolor=#d6d6d6
| 0 ||  || MBA-O || 16.5 || 2.8 km || multiple || 2001–2020 || 27 Jan 2020 || 47 || align=left | Disc.: SDSS || 
|- id="2001 SE359" bgcolor=#fefefe
| 1 ||  || HUN || 18.8 || data-sort-value="0.52" | 520 m || multiple || 2001–2017 || 23 Oct 2017 || 46 || align=left | Disc.: SDSS || 
|- id="2001 SF359" bgcolor=#fefefe
| 0 ||  || MBA-I || 18.3 || data-sort-value="0.65" | 650 m || multiple || 2001–2020 || 05 Nov 2020 || 77 || align=left | Disc.: LPL/Spacewatch II || 
|- id="2001 SH359" bgcolor=#E9E9E9
| 0 ||  || MBA-M || 17.9 || 1.1 km || multiple || 2001–2019 || 08 Jan 2019 || 43 || align=left | Disc.: SDSS || 
|- id="2001 SK359" bgcolor=#E9E9E9
| 0 ||  || MBA-M || 17.3 || 1.9 km || multiple || 2001–2021 || 18 Jan 2021 || 62 || align=left | Disc.: SDSS || 
|- id="2001 SL359" bgcolor=#E9E9E9
| 1 ||  || MBA-M || 18.25 || data-sort-value="0.67" | 670 m || multiple || 2001–2021 || 31 Jul 2021 || 70 || align=left | Disc.: NEAT || 
|- id="2001 SM359" bgcolor=#fefefe
| 0 ||  || MBA-I || 18.4 || data-sort-value="0.62" | 620 m || multiple || 2001–2019 || 23 May 2019 || 34 || align=left | Disc.: SDSS || 
|- id="2001 SN359" bgcolor=#d6d6d6
| 0 ||  || MBA-O || 17.07 || 2.1 km || multiple || 2001–2021 || 25 Nov 2021 || 77 || align=left | Disc.: SDSS || 
|- id="2001 SO359" bgcolor=#d6d6d6
| 0 ||  || MBA-O || 16.9 || 2.3 km || multiple || 2001–2020 || 11 May 2020 || 40 || align=left | Disc.: LPL/Spacewatch II || 
|- id="2001 SP359" bgcolor=#d6d6d6
| 0 ||  || MBA-O || 16.6 || 2.7 km || multiple || 2001–2018 || 12 Nov 2018 || 32 || align=left | Disc.: SDSS || 
|- id="2001 SQ359" bgcolor=#E9E9E9
| 0 ||  || MBA-M || 17.71 || data-sort-value="0.85" | 850 m || multiple || 2001–2021 || 26 Oct 2021 || 35 || align=left | Disc.: LPL/Spacewatch II || 
|- id="2001 SR359" bgcolor=#fefefe
| 0 ||  || MBA-I || 18.0 || data-sort-value="0.75" | 750 m || multiple || 2001–2020 || 18 Dec 2020 || 38 || align=left | Disc.: LPL/Spacewatch II || 
|- id="2001 SS359" bgcolor=#E9E9E9
| 0 ||  || MBA-M || 17.74 || 1.2 km || multiple || 2001–2021 || 15 May 2021 || 49 || align=left | Disc.: SDSS || 
|- id="2001 ST359" bgcolor=#d6d6d6
| 0 ||  || MBA-O || 16.8 || 2.4 km || multiple || 2001–2020 || 22 Apr 2020 || 45 || align=left | Disc.: Spacewatch || 
|- id="2001 SU359" bgcolor=#d6d6d6
| 0 ||  || MBA-O || 16.7 || 2.5 km || multiple || 2001–2021 || 13 Jun 2021 || 36 || align=left | Disc.: SDSS || 
|- id="2001 SV359" bgcolor=#fefefe
| 0 ||  || MBA-I || 18.2 || data-sort-value="0.68" | 680 m || multiple || 2001–2019 || 08 Jul 2019 || 79 || align=left | Disc.: SDSSAlt.: 2019 MO7 || 
|- id="2001 SW359" bgcolor=#fefefe
| 0 ||  || MBA-I || 17.9 || data-sort-value="0.78" | 780 m || multiple || 2001–2021 || 06 Jan 2021 || 79 || align=left | Disc.: SDSS || 
|- id="2001 SX359" bgcolor=#fefefe
| 1 ||  || MBA-I || 18.8 || data-sort-value="0.52" | 520 m || multiple || 2001–2020 || 24 Jan 2020 || 44 || align=left | Disc.: LPL/Spacewatch II || 
|- id="2001 SY359" bgcolor=#fefefe
| 1 ||  || MBA-I || 19.0 || data-sort-value="0.47" | 470 m || multiple || 2001–2019 || 13 Jan 2019 || 30 || align=left | Disc.: Spacewatch || 
|- id="2001 SZ359" bgcolor=#FA8072
| 0 ||  || MCA || 19.1 || data-sort-value="0.45" | 450 m || multiple || 2001–2017 || 26 Jun 2017 || 31 || align=left | Disc.: Spacewatch || 
|- id="2001 SA360" bgcolor=#E9E9E9
| 1 ||  || MBA-M || 18.16 || data-sort-value="0.69" | 690 m || multiple || 2001–2021 || 01 Nov 2021 || 53 || align=left | Disc.: Spacewatch || 
|- id="2001 SB360" bgcolor=#fefefe
| 1 ||  || MBA-I || 18.9 || data-sort-value="0.49" | 490 m || multiple || 2001–2019 || 17 Dec 2019 || 32 || align=left | Disc.: Spacewatch || 
|- id="2001 SC360" bgcolor=#E9E9E9
| 0 ||  || MBA-M || 18.1 || 1.0 km || multiple || 2001–2019 || 31 Dec 2019 || 38 || align=left | Disc.: SDSS || 
|- id="2001 SD360" bgcolor=#d6d6d6
| 0 ||  || MBA-O || 16.92 || 2.3 km || multiple || 2001–2021 || 12 Sep 2021 || 48 || align=left | Disc.: SDSS || 
|- id="2001 SE360" bgcolor=#fefefe
| 0 ||  || MBA-I || 18.4 || data-sort-value="0.62" | 620 m || multiple || 2001–2020 || 14 Jul 2020 || 33 || align=left | Disc.: NEAT || 
|- id="2001 SF360" bgcolor=#E9E9E9
| 1 ||  || MBA-M || 18.3 || data-sort-value="0.92" | 920 m || multiple || 2001–2018 || 18 Oct 2018 || 56 || align=left | Disc.: LPL/Spacewatch II || 
|- id="2001 SG360" bgcolor=#E9E9E9
| 0 ||  || MBA-M || 18.20 || 1.3 km || multiple || 2001–2021 || 18 Jan 2021 || 43 || align=left | Disc.: LPL/Spacewatch II || 
|- id="2001 SJ360" bgcolor=#E9E9E9
| 0 ||  || MBA-M || 16.65 || 2.6 km || multiple || 2001–2021 || 14 Apr 2021 || 229 || align=left | Disc.: NEAT || 
|- id="2001 SL360" bgcolor=#d6d6d6
| 0 ||  || MBA-O || 16.22 || 3.2 km || multiple || 2001–2021 || 06 Apr 2021 || 110 || align=left | Disc.: SDSS || 
|- id="2001 SM360" bgcolor=#E9E9E9
| 0 ||  || MBA-M || 16.75 || 1.9 km || multiple || 2001–2021 || 12 May 2021 || 124 || align=left | Disc.: SDSS || 
|- id="2001 SN360" bgcolor=#fefefe
| 0 ||  || MBA-I || 18.0 || data-sort-value="0.75" | 750 m || multiple || 2001–2019 || 25 Sep 2019 || 80 || align=left | Disc.: LPL/Spacewatch II || 
|- id="2001 SO360" bgcolor=#fefefe
| 0 ||  || MBA-I || 18.16 || data-sort-value="0.69" | 690 m || multiple || 2001–2021 || 14 Apr 2021 || 95 || align=left | Disc.: SDSS || 
|- id="2001 SP360" bgcolor=#E9E9E9
| 0 ||  || MBA-M || 17.4 || 1.4 km || multiple || 2001–2021 || 16 Jan 2021 || 70 || align=left | Disc.: Spacewatch || 
|- id="2001 SQ360" bgcolor=#d6d6d6
| 0 ||  || MBA-O || 16.45 || 2.9 km || multiple || 2001–2021 || 14 Jun 2021 || 108 || align=left | Disc.: SDSS || 
|- id="2001 SR360" bgcolor=#fefefe
| 0 ||  || MBA-I || 18.2 || data-sort-value="0.68" | 680 m || multiple || 2001–2020 || 20 Oct 2020 || 64 || align=left | Disc.: Spacewatch || 
|- id="2001 ST360" bgcolor=#d6d6d6
| 0 ||  || MBA-O || 16.6 || 2.7 km || multiple || 2001–2020 || 22 Mar 2020 || 84 || align=left | Disc.: LPL/Spacewatch II || 
|- id="2001 SU360" bgcolor=#d6d6d6
| 0 ||  || MBA-O || 16.75 || 2.5 km || multiple || 2001–2021 || 13 Jul 2021 || 86 || align=left | Disc.: SDSS || 
|- id="2001 SV360" bgcolor=#d6d6d6
| 0 ||  || MBA-O || 17.3 || 1.9 km || multiple || 2001–2019 || 05 Feb 2019 || 54 || align=left | Disc.: SDSS || 
|- id="2001 SW360" bgcolor=#fefefe
| 0 ||  || MBA-I || 18.2 || data-sort-value="0.68" | 680 m || multiple || 2001–2019 || 19 Nov 2019 || 60 || align=left | Disc.: Spacewatch || 
|- id="2001 SX360" bgcolor=#E9E9E9
| 2 ||  || MBA-M || 18.4 || data-sort-value="0.88" | 880 m || multiple || 2001–2018 || 06 Oct 2018 || 58 || align=left | Disc.: SDSS || 
|- id="2001 SY360" bgcolor=#E9E9E9
| 0 ||  || MBA-M || 17.1 || 1.1 km || multiple || 2001–2021 || 08 Jun 2021 || 64 || align=left | Disc.: SDSS || 
|- id="2001 SZ360" bgcolor=#E9E9E9
| 1 ||  || MBA-M || 17.9 || 1.5 km || multiple || 2001–2019 || 22 Oct 2019 || 57 || align=left | Disc.: SDSS || 
|- id="2001 SB361" bgcolor=#fefefe
| 0 ||  || MBA-I || 18.19 || data-sort-value="0.68" | 680 m || multiple || 2001–2022 || 26 Jan 2022 || 76 || align=left | Disc.: SDSS || 
|- id="2001 SC361" bgcolor=#E9E9E9
| 0 ||  || MBA-M || 17.62 || data-sort-value="0.89" | 890 m || multiple || 2001–2021 || 08 May 2021 || 90 || align=left | Disc.: SDSS || 
|- id="2001 SE361" bgcolor=#E9E9E9
| 0 ||  || MBA-M || 17.6 || 1.3 km || multiple || 2001–2019 || 05 Nov 2019 || 62 || align=left | Disc.: SpacewatchAlt.: 2010 MR143 || 
|- id="2001 SF361" bgcolor=#E9E9E9
| 0 ||  || MBA-M || 17.37 || 1.0 km || multiple || 2001–2021 || 03 Aug 2021 || 101 || align=left | Disc.: NEAT || 
|- id="2001 SG361" bgcolor=#E9E9E9
| 0 ||  || MBA-M || 17.70 || 1.2 km || multiple || 2001–2021 || 09 Apr 2021 || 80 || align=left | Disc.: SDSS || 
|- id="2001 SJ361" bgcolor=#d6d6d6
| 0 ||  || MBA-O || 17.0 || 2.2 km || multiple || 2001–2019 || 05 Feb 2019 || 46 || align=left | Disc.: SDSS || 
|- id="2001 SK361" bgcolor=#E9E9E9
| 2 ||  || MBA-M || 18.3 || 1.2 km || multiple || 2001–2019 || 05 Nov 2019 || 57 || align=left | Disc.: LPL/Spacewatch II || 
|- id="2001 SL361" bgcolor=#d6d6d6
| 0 ||  || MBA-O || 16.69 || 2.6 km || multiple || 2001–2021 || 09 Apr 2021 || 100 || align=left | Disc.: SDSSAlt.: 2010 NF134 || 
|- id="2001 SN361" bgcolor=#E9E9E9
| 0 ||  || MBA-M || 17.1 || 2.1 km || multiple || 2001–2020 || 23 Oct 2020 || 76 || align=left | Disc.: SDSS || 
|- id="2001 SP361" bgcolor=#fefefe
| 0 ||  || MBA-I || 18.2 || data-sort-value="0.68" | 680 m || multiple || 2001–2019 || 19 Nov 2019 || 51 || align=left | Disc.: SDSS || 
|- id="2001 SQ361" bgcolor=#d6d6d6
| 0 ||  || MBA-O || 16.7 || 2.5 km || multiple || 2001–2019 || 19 Nov 2019 || 44 || align=left | Disc.: SDSS || 
|- id="2001 SR361" bgcolor=#d6d6d6
| 0 ||  || MBA-O || 16.4 || 2.9 km || multiple || 2001–2018 || 03 Oct 2018 || 49 || align=left | Disc.: NEAT || 
|- id="2001 SS361" bgcolor=#fefefe
| 1 ||  || MBA-I || 18.6 || data-sort-value="0.57" | 570 m || multiple || 1994–2019 || 29 Oct 2019 || 60 || align=left | Disc.: LPL/Spacewatch II || 
|- id="2001 ST361" bgcolor=#d6d6d6
| 0 ||  || MBA-O || 16.6 || 2.7 km || multiple || 2001–2021 || 07 Jan 2021 || 60 || align=left | Disc.: SDSS || 
|- id="2001 SU361" bgcolor=#E9E9E9
| 0 ||  || MBA-M || 17.83 || 1.5 km || multiple || 2001–2019 || 23 Oct 2019 || 45 || align=left | Disc.: LPL/Spacewatch II || 
|- id="2001 SV361" bgcolor=#d6d6d6
| 0 ||  || MBA-O || 16.9 || 2.3 km || multiple || 2001–2018 || 21 Jun 2018 || 38 || align=left | Disc.: SDSS || 
|- id="2001 SW361" bgcolor=#E9E9E9
| 0 ||  || MBA-M || 17.69 || data-sort-value="0.86" | 860 m || multiple || 1997–2021 || 21 Apr 2021 || 72 || align=left | Disc.: NEAT || 
|- id="2001 SX361" bgcolor=#E9E9E9
| 0 ||  || MBA-M || 17.3 || 1.9 km || multiple || 2001–2019 || 26 Nov 2019 || 42 || align=left | Disc.: SDSS || 
|- id="2001 SY361" bgcolor=#d6d6d6
| 0 ||  || MBA-O || 16.67 || 2.6 km || multiple || 2001–2021 || 08 Apr 2021 || 71 || align=left | Disc.: SDSS || 
|- id="2001 SZ361" bgcolor=#E9E9E9
| 0 ||  || MBA-M || 17.7 || data-sort-value="0.86" | 860 m || multiple || 2001–2021 || 13 Jun 2021 || 52 || align=left | Disc.: SDSS || 
|- id="2001 SA362" bgcolor=#E9E9E9
| 0 ||  || MBA-M || 17.28 || 1.5 km || multiple || 2001–2021 || 09 May 2021 || 69 || align=left | Disc.: SDSS || 
|- id="2001 SB362" bgcolor=#E9E9E9
| 0 ||  || MBA-M || 18.22 || data-sort-value="0.95" | 950 m || multiple || 2001–2021 || 07 Apr 2021 || 45 || align=left | Disc.: Spacewatch || 
|- id="2001 SC362" bgcolor=#E9E9E9
| 0 ||  || MBA-M || 17.51 || 1.3 km || multiple || 2001–2021 || 30 Jul 2021 || 79 || align=left | Disc.: SDSS || 
|- id="2001 SD362" bgcolor=#E9E9E9
| 0 ||  || MBA-M || 17.1 || 1.1 km || multiple || 2001–2020 || 27 Apr 2020 || 69 || align=left | Disc.: NEAT || 
|- id="2001 SE362" bgcolor=#fefefe
| 0 ||  || MBA-I || 18.77 || data-sort-value="0.52" | 520 m || multiple || 2001–2019 || 25 Sep 2019 || 48 || align=left | Disc.: LPL/Spacewatch II || 
|- id="2001 SF362" bgcolor=#d6d6d6
| 0 ||  || MBA-O || 16.4 || 2.9 km || multiple || 2001–2020 || 01 Feb 2020 || 47 || align=left | Disc.: SDSS || 
|- id="2001 SG362" bgcolor=#E9E9E9
| 0 ||  || MBA-M || 17.77 || 1.2 km || multiple || 2001–2021 || 11 May 2021 || 60 || align=left | Disc.: SDSS || 
|- id="2001 SH362" bgcolor=#E9E9E9
| 0 ||  || MBA-M || 17.4 || 1.4 km || multiple || 2001–2020 || 28 Apr 2020 || 47 || align=left | Disc.: SDSS || 
|- id="2001 SJ362" bgcolor=#E9E9E9
| 1 ||  || MBA-M || 18.25 || data-sort-value="0.67" | 670 m || multiple || 2001–2022 || 07 Jan 2022 || 86 || align=left | Disc.: SDSS || 
|- id="2001 SL362" bgcolor=#d6d6d6
| 0 ||  || MBA-O || 17.4 || 1.8 km || multiple || 2001–2019 || 05 Feb 2019 || 40 || align=left | Disc.: SDSS || 
|- id="2001 SM362" bgcolor=#d6d6d6
| 0 ||  || MBA-O || 17.2 || 2.0 km || multiple || 2001–2018 || 09 Nov 2018 || 41 || align=left | Disc.: SDSS || 
|- id="2001 SN362" bgcolor=#E9E9E9
| 0 ||  || MBA-M || 17.4 || data-sort-value="0.98" | 980 m || multiple || 2001–2020 || 21 Apr 2020 || 46 || align=left | Disc.: SDSS || 
|- id="2001 SO362" bgcolor=#fefefe
| 0 ||  || MBA-I || 18.61 || data-sort-value="0.56" | 560 m || multiple || 2001–2021 || 08 Nov 2021 || 67 || align=left | Disc.: LPL/Spacewatch II || 
|- id="2001 SP362" bgcolor=#E9E9E9
| 1 ||  || MBA-M || 18.4 || data-sort-value="0.88" | 880 m || multiple || 2001–2019 || 26 Nov 2019 || 30 || align=left | Disc.: SDSS || 
|- id="2001 SQ362" bgcolor=#E9E9E9
| 1 ||  || MBA-M || 17.7 || 1.6 km || multiple || 2001–2019 || 24 Aug 2019 || 29 || align=left | Disc.: SDSS || 
|- id="2001 SR362" bgcolor=#d6d6d6
| 1 ||  || MBA-O || 16.3 || 3.1 km || multiple || 2001–2018 || 03 Oct 2018 || 35 || align=left | Disc.: LPL/Spacewatch II || 
|- id="2001 SS362" bgcolor=#fefefe
| 0 ||  || HUN || 18.7 || data-sort-value="0.54" | 540 m || multiple || 2001–2019 || 25 Jul 2019 || 32 || align=left | Disc.: Spacewatch || 
|- id="2001 ST362" bgcolor=#E9E9E9
| 1 ||  || MBA-M || 17.82 || data-sort-value="0.81" | 810 m || multiple || 2001–2021 || 04 Aug 2021 || 40 || align=left | Disc.: SDSS || 
|- id="2001 SU362" bgcolor=#fefefe
| 0 ||  || MBA-I || 17.9 || data-sort-value="0.78" | 780 m || multiple || 2001–2020 || 20 Oct 2020 || 49 || align=left | Disc.: SDSS || 
|- id="2001 SV362" bgcolor=#E9E9E9
| 0 ||  || MBA-M || 18.11 || data-sort-value="0.71" | 710 m || multiple || 2001–2021 || 07 Jun 2021 || 46 || align=left | Disc.: SDSS || 
|- id="2001 SW362" bgcolor=#E9E9E9
| 0 ||  || MBA-M || 17.1 || 1.6 km || multiple || 2001–2021 || 08 Jan 2021 || 71 || align=left | Disc.: Mauna Kea Obs. || 
|- id="2001 SY362" bgcolor=#d6d6d6
| 0 ||  || MBA-O || 17.3 || 1.9 km || multiple || 2001–2020 || 23 Sep 2020 || 71 || align=left | Disc.: LPL/Spacewatch II || 
|- id="2001 SA363" bgcolor=#E9E9E9
| 0 ||  || MBA-M || 18.71 || 1.0 km || multiple || 2001–2019 || 24 Sep 2019 || 66 || align=left | Disc.: SpacewatchAlt.: 2010 KS80 || 
|- id="2001 SB363" bgcolor=#d6d6d6
| 0 ||  || MBA-O || 16.68 || 2.6 km || multiple || 2001–2021 || 17 Apr 2021 || 53 || align=left | Disc.: LPL/Spacewatch II || 
|- id="2001 SD363" bgcolor=#E9E9E9
| 0 ||  || MBA-M || 17.7 || 1.6 km || multiple || 2001–2020 || 11 Dec 2020 || 55 || align=left | Disc.: LPL/Spacewatch II || 
|- id="2001 SF363" bgcolor=#fefefe
| 1 ||  || MBA-I || 18.8 || data-sort-value="0.52" | 520 m || multiple || 2001–2019 || 19 Dec 2019 || 41 || align=left | Disc.: NEAT || 
|- id="2001 SG363" bgcolor=#fefefe
| 1 ||  || MBA-I || 19.0 || data-sort-value="0.47" | 470 m || multiple || 2001–2019 || 25 Sep 2019 || 38 || align=left | Disc.: Spacewatch || 
|- id="2001 SH363" bgcolor=#d6d6d6
| 0 ||  || MBA-O || 16.98 || 2.2 km || multiple || 2001–2021 || 09 Apr 2021 || 42 || align=left | Disc.: SDSS || 
|- id="2001 SK363" bgcolor=#d6d6d6
| 0 ||  || MBA-O || 16.1 || 3.4 km || multiple || 2001–2020 || 23 Jan 2020 || 80 || align=left | Disc.: SDSS || 
|- id="2001 SL363" bgcolor=#d6d6d6
| 0 ||  || MBA-O || 16.05 || 3.4 km || multiple || 2001–2021 || 12 May 2021 || 111 || align=left | Disc.: SDSS || 
|- id="2001 SM363" bgcolor=#d6d6d6
| 0 ||  || MBA-O || 16.30 || 3.1 km || multiple || 2001–2021 || 07 Apr 2021 || 61 || align=left | Disc.: SDSS || 
|- id="2001 SN363" bgcolor=#E9E9E9
| 0 ||  || MBA-M || 18.0 || 1.4 km || multiple || 2001–2019 || 23 Oct 2019 || 54 || align=left | Disc.: LPL/Spacewatch II || 
|- id="2001 SO363" bgcolor=#E9E9E9
| 1 ||  || MBA-M || 18.50 || data-sort-value="0.59" | 590 m || multiple || 2001–2021 || 09 Nov 2021 || 91 || align=left | Disc.: Spacewatch || 
|- id="2001 SP363" bgcolor=#fefefe
| 0 ||  || MBA-I || 18.6 || data-sort-value="0.57" | 570 m || multiple || 2001–2020 || 03 Jan 2020 || 49 || align=left | Disc.: Spacewatch || 
|- id="2001 SQ363" bgcolor=#d6d6d6
| 0 ||  || MBA-O || 17.1 || 2.1 km || multiple || 2001–2020 || 17 Sep 2020 || 96 || align=left | Disc.: SDSS || 
|- id="2001 SR363" bgcolor=#d6d6d6
| 0 ||  || MBA-O || 17.0 || 2.2 km || multiple || 2001–2020 || 31 Jan 2020 || 49 || align=left | Disc.: SDSS || 
|- id="2001 SS363" bgcolor=#E9E9E9
| 1 ||  || MBA-M || 18.8 || data-sort-value="0.97" | 970 m || multiple || 2001–2019 || 22 Oct 2019 || 41 || align=left | Disc.: SDSS || 
|- id="2001 ST363" bgcolor=#E9E9E9
| 1 ||  || MBA-M || 18.5 || 1.1 km || multiple || 2001–2021 || 16 Jan 2021 || 55 || align=left | Disc.: Spacewatch || 
|- id="2001 SU363" bgcolor=#E9E9E9
| 0 ||  || MBA-M || 17.0 || 1.2 km || multiple || 2001–2021 || 09 Jun 2021 || 81 || align=left | Disc.: SDSS || 
|- id="2001 SV363" bgcolor=#d6d6d6
| 0 ||  || MBA-O || 16.42 || 2.9 km || multiple || 2001–2021 || 17 Apr 2021 || 71 || align=left | Disc.: SDSS || 
|- id="2001 SW363" bgcolor=#d6d6d6
| 0 ||  || MBA-O || 16.6 || 2.7 km || multiple || 2001–2019 || 20 Dec 2019 || 47 || align=left | Disc.: SDSS || 
|- id="2001 SY363" bgcolor=#E9E9E9
| 1 ||  || MBA-M || 17.2 || 1.1 km || multiple || 2001–2020 || 16 Mar 2020 || 48 || align=left | Disc.: LPL/Spacewatch II || 
|- id="2001 SZ363" bgcolor=#d6d6d6
| 0 ||  || MBA-O || 16.69 || 2.6 km || multiple || 2001–2021 || 09 May 2021 || 80 || align=left | Disc.: SDSSAlt.: 2010 MH84 || 
|- id="2001 SA364" bgcolor=#E9E9E9
| 0 ||  || MBA-M || 17.5 || data-sort-value="0.94" | 940 m || multiple || 2001–2020 || 16 Mar 2020 || 71 || align=left | Disc.: SDSS || 
|- id="2001 SB364" bgcolor=#d6d6d6
| 0 ||  || MBA-O || 17.23 || 2.0 km || multiple || 2001–2021 || 19 Apr 2021 || 51 || align=left | Disc.: SDSS || 
|- id="2001 SC364" bgcolor=#d6d6d6
| 2 ||  || MBA-O || 16.7 || 2.5 km || multiple || 2001–2019 || 19 Dec 2019 || 39 || align=left | Disc.: Spacewatch || 
|- id="2001 SD364" bgcolor=#E9E9E9
| 0 ||  || MBA-M || 18.2 || data-sort-value="0.96" | 960 m || multiple || 2001–2020 || 22 Jan 2020 || 29 || align=left | Disc.: SDSS || 
|- id="2001 SE364" bgcolor=#d6d6d6
| 1 ||  || MBA-O || 17.3 || 1.9 km || multiple || 2001–2017 || 26 Nov 2017 || 21 || align=left | Disc.: SDSS || 
|- id="2001 SF364" bgcolor=#fefefe
| 3 ||  || MBA-I || 19.2 || data-sort-value="0.43" | 430 m || single || 61 days || 21 Nov 2001 || 20 || align=left | Disc.: SDSSAdded on 22 July 2020 || 
|- id="2001 SG364" bgcolor=#d6d6d6
| 0 ||  || MBA-O || 16.19 || 3.2 km || multiple || 2001–2021 || 03 May 2021 || 89 || align=left | Disc.: NEATAdded on 22 July 2020 || 
|- id="2001 SJ364" bgcolor=#C2FFFF
| 0 ||  || JT || 14.54 || 6.9 km || multiple || 2001–2020 || 24 Jun 2020 || 58 || align=left | Disc.: SDSSAdded on 13 September 2020Trojan camp (L5) || 
|- id="2001 SK364" bgcolor=#d6d6d6
| 0 ||  || MBA-O || 16.73 || 2.5 km || multiple || 2001–2021 || 05 Jun 2021 || 51 || align=left | Disc.: SDSSAdded on 19 October 2020 || 
|- id="2001 SL364" bgcolor=#E9E9E9
| 0 ||  || MBA-M || 17.3 || 1.9 km || multiple || 2001–2020 || 13 Nov 2020 || 75 || align=left | Disc.: LPL/Spacewatch IIAdded on 17 January 2021 || 
|- id="2001 SN364" bgcolor=#fefefe
| 0 ||  || MBA-I || 19.31 || data-sort-value="0.41" | 410 m || multiple || 2001–2019 || 28 Sep 2019 || 29 || align=left | Disc.: LPL/Spacewatch IIAdded on 17 January 2021 || 
|- id="2001 SP364" bgcolor=#fefefe
| 0 ||  || MBA-I || 18.2 || data-sort-value="0.68" | 680 m || multiple || 2001–2021 || 06 Jan 2021 || 74 || align=left | Disc.: SpacewatchAdded on 17 January 2021 || 
|- id="2001 SQ364" bgcolor=#d6d6d6
| 0 ||  || MBA-O || 17.1 || 2.1 km || multiple || 2001–2020 || 17 Oct 2020 || 35 || align=left | Disc.: SpacewatchAdded on 17 January 2021 || 
|- id="2001 SR364" bgcolor=#fefefe
| 0 ||  || MBA-I || 18.5 || data-sort-value="0.59" | 590 m || multiple || 2000–2020 || 16 Sep 2020 || 48 || align=left | Disc.: SpacewatchAdded on 9 March 2021 || 
|- id="2001 ST364" bgcolor=#fefefe
| 0 ||  || MBA-I || 18.6 || data-sort-value="0.57" | 570 m || multiple || 2001–2020 || 10 Nov 2020 || 38 || align=left | Disc.: LPL/Spacewatch IIAdded on 11 May 2021Alt.: 2019 JJ33 || 
|- id="2001 SU364" bgcolor=#E9E9E9
| 0 ||  || MBA-M || 18.3 || 1.2 km || multiple || 2001–2021 || 17 Jan 2021 || 29 || align=left | Disc.: SDSSAdded on 11 May 2021 || 
|- id="2001 SX364" bgcolor=#fefefe
| 1 ||  || MBA-I || 18.9 || data-sort-value="0.49" | 490 m || multiple || 2001–2015 || 13 Sep 2015 || 16 || align=left | Disc.: SDSSAdded on 21 August 2021 || 
|- id="2001 SY364" bgcolor=#fefefe
| 1 ||  || MBA-I || 19.7 || data-sort-value="0.34" | 340 m || multiple || 2001–2019 || 05 Jul 2019 || 19 || align=left | Disc.: SpacewatchAdded on 21 August 2021 || 
|- id="2001 SB365" bgcolor=#d6d6d6
| 0 ||  || MBA-O || 17.45 || 1.8 km || multiple || 2001–2021 || 02 Dec 2021 || 77 || align=left | Disc.: SpacewatchAdded on 24 December 2021 || 
|- id="2001 SC365" bgcolor=#d6d6d6
| 0 ||  || MBA-O || 17.12 || 2.1 km || multiple || 2001–2021 || 08 Sep 2021 || 54 || align=left | Disc.: SDSSAdded on 24 December 2021 || 
|- id="2001 SD365" bgcolor=#fefefe
| 1 ||  || MBA-I || 19.0 || data-sort-value="0.47" | 470 m || multiple || 2001–2015 || 08 Sep 2015 || 12 || align=left | Disc.: SDSSAdded on 29 January 2022 || 
|}
back to top

References 
 

Lists of unnumbered minor planets